= Castro culture =

Archaeological culture of the Iberian peninsula

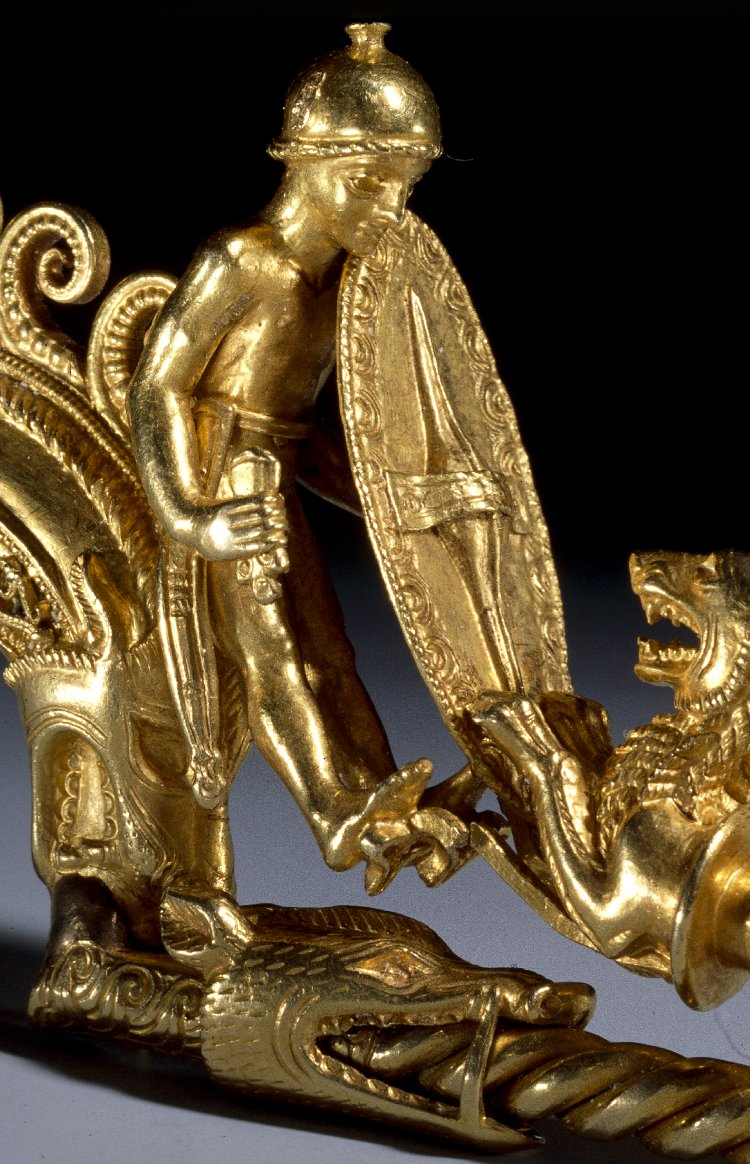
Celtic naked warrior of the Braganza Brooch or fibula, gold (Norte Region, Portugal)

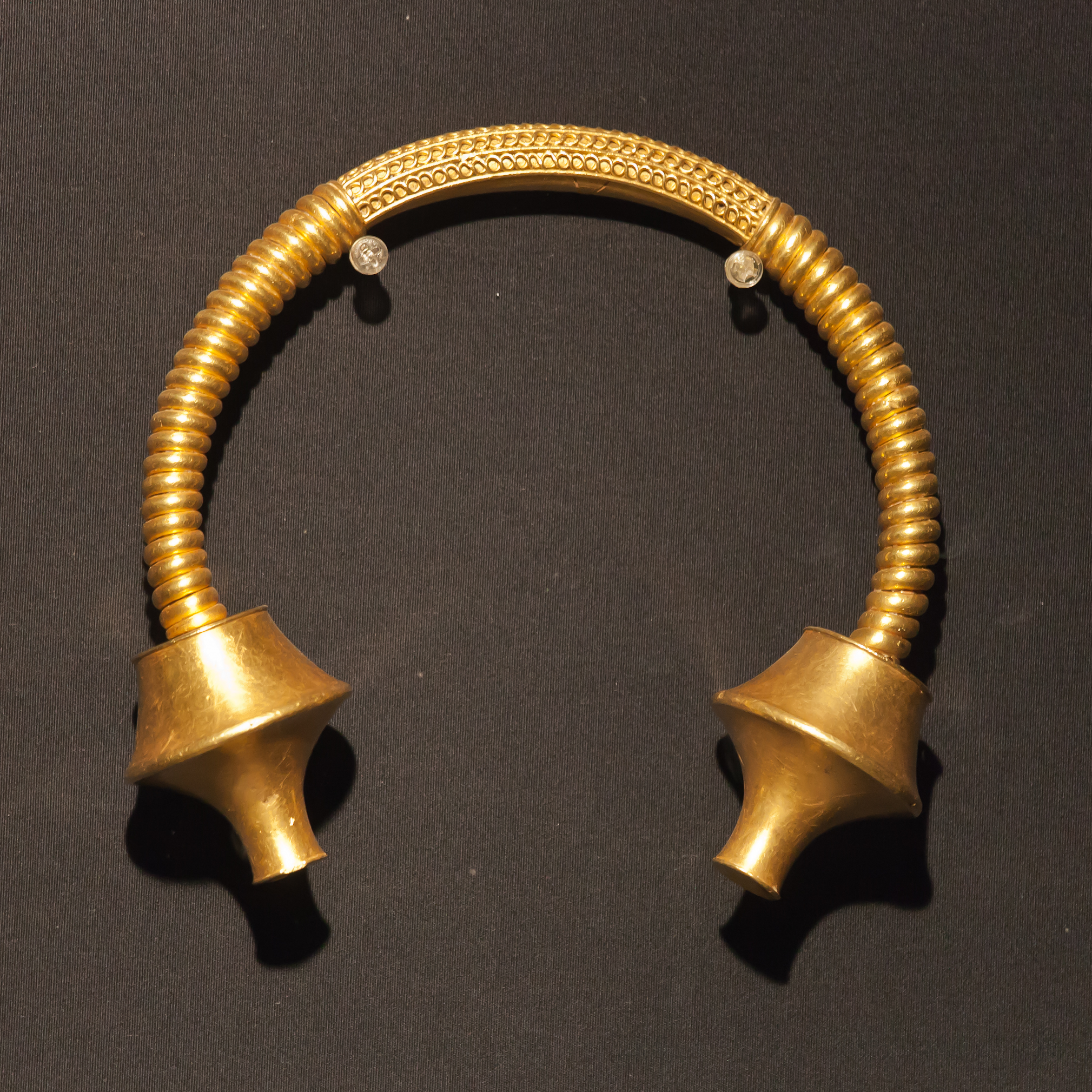
Gold torc from Burela (Galicia, Spain)

Castro culture (Galician: cultura castrexa, Portuguese: cultura castreja, Asturian: cultura castriega, Spanish: cultura castreña, meaning "culture of the hillforts") is the archaeological term for the material culture of the northwestern regions of the Iberian Peninsula (present-day northern and central Portugal together with the Spanish regions of Galicia, Asturias, and western León) from the end of the Bronze Age (c. 9th century BC) until it was subsumed by Roman culture (c. 1st century BC). It is the culture associated with the Celtic Gallaecians and Astures.

The most notable characteristics of this culture are its walled oppida and hillforts, known locally as castros, from Latin castrum 'castle', and the scarcity of visible burial practices, in spite of the frequent deposition of prestige items and goods, swords and other metallic riches in rocky outcrops, rivers and other aquatic contexts since the Atlantic Bronze Age. This cultural area extended east to the Cares river and south into the lower Douro river valley.

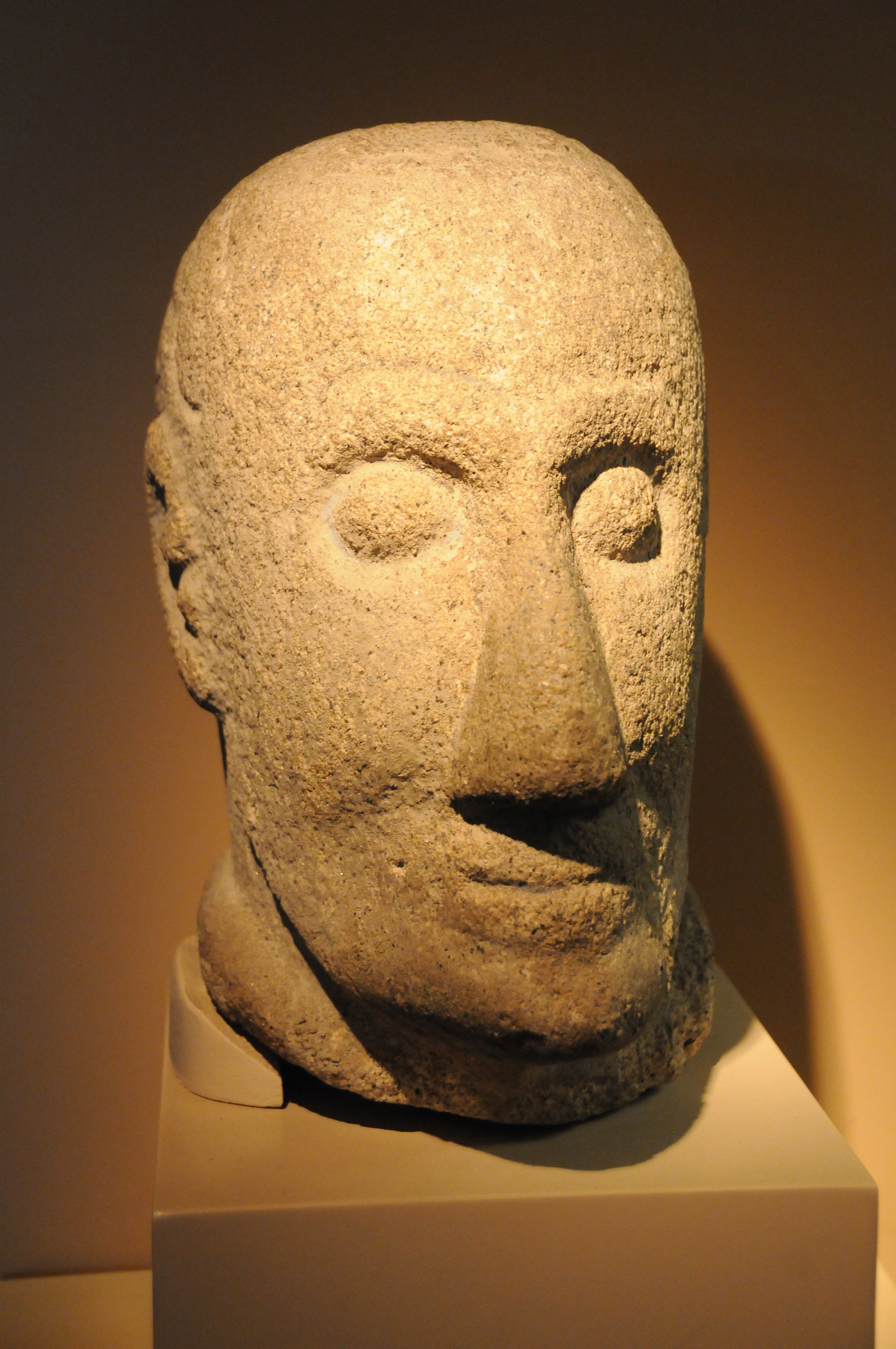
The "Cabeza de Rubiás" (Museu Arqueologico de Ourense, Galicia)

The area of Ave Valley in Portugal was the core region of this culture, with many small Castro settlements, but also including larger oppida, the cividades (from Latin civitas 'city'), some known as citânias by archaeologists, due to their city-like structure: Cividade de Bagunte (Civitas Bogonti), Cividade de Terroso (Civitas Terroso), Citânia de Briteiros, and Citânia de Sanfins.

== History ==
The Castro culture emerged during the first two centuries of the first millennium BC, in the region extending from the Douro river up to the Minho, but soon expanding north along the coast, and east following the river valleys, reaching the mountain ranges which separate the Atlantic coast of the Iberian peninsula from the central plateau or meseta. It was the result of the autonomous evolution of Atlantic Bronze Age communities, after the local collapse of the long range Atlantic network of interchange of prestige items.

=== The end of the Atlantic Bronze Age ===
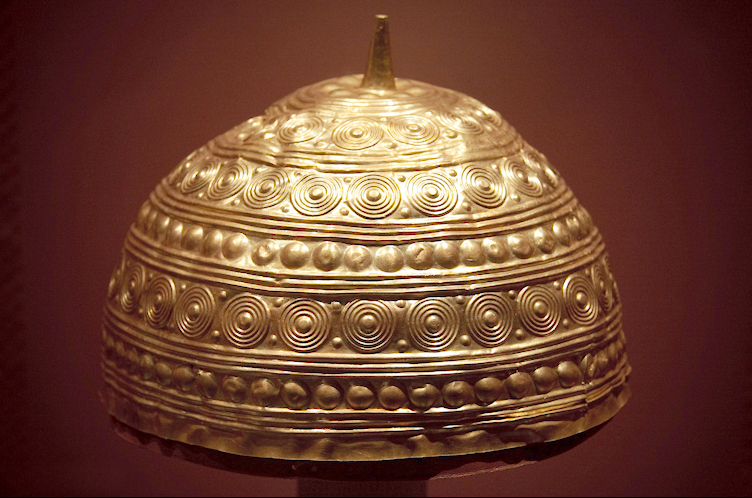
Late Bronze Age golden helmet from Leiro (Galicia)

From the Mondego river up to the Minho river, along the coastal areas of northern Portugal, during the last two centuries of the second millennium BC a series of settlements were established in high, well communicated places, radiating from a core area north of the Mondego, and usually specializing in the production of Atlantic Bronze Age metallurgy: cauldrons, knives, bronze vases, roasting spits, flesh-hooks, swords, axes and jewelry relating to a noble elite who celebrated ritual banquets and who participated in an extensive network of interchange of prestige items, from the Mediterranean and up to the British Isles. These villages were closely related to the open settlements which characterized the first Bronze Age, frequently established near the valleys and the richer agricultural lands.

From the beginning of the first millennium, the network appears to collapse, possibly because the Iron Age had outdated the Atlantic tin and bronze products in the Mediterranean region, and the large-scale production of metallic items was reduced to the elaboration of axes and tools, which are still found buried in very large quantities all along the European Atlantic coast.

=== Formative period ===
During the transition from the Bronze to the Iron Age, from the Douro in modern northern Portugal and up along the coasts of Galicia until the central regions of Asturias, the settlement in artificially fortified places substituted the old open settlement model. These early hill-forts were small (1 ha at most), being situated on hills, peninsulas or other naturally defended places, usually endowed with long range visibility. The artificial defences were initially composed of earthen walls, battlements and ditches, which enclosed an inner habitable space. This space was mostly left void, non-urbanised, and used for communal activities, comprising a few circular, oblong, or rounded squared huts, of 5 to 15 meters (16–49 ft) in the largest dimension, built with wood, vegetable materials and mud, sometimes reinforced with stony low walls. The major inner feature of these multi-functional undivided cabins were the hearth, circular or quadrangular, and which conditioned the uses of the other spaces of the room.

In essence, the main characteristic of this formative period is the assumption by the community of a larger authority at the expense of the elites, reflected in the minor importance of prestige items production, while the collective invested important resources and labour in the communal spaces and defences.

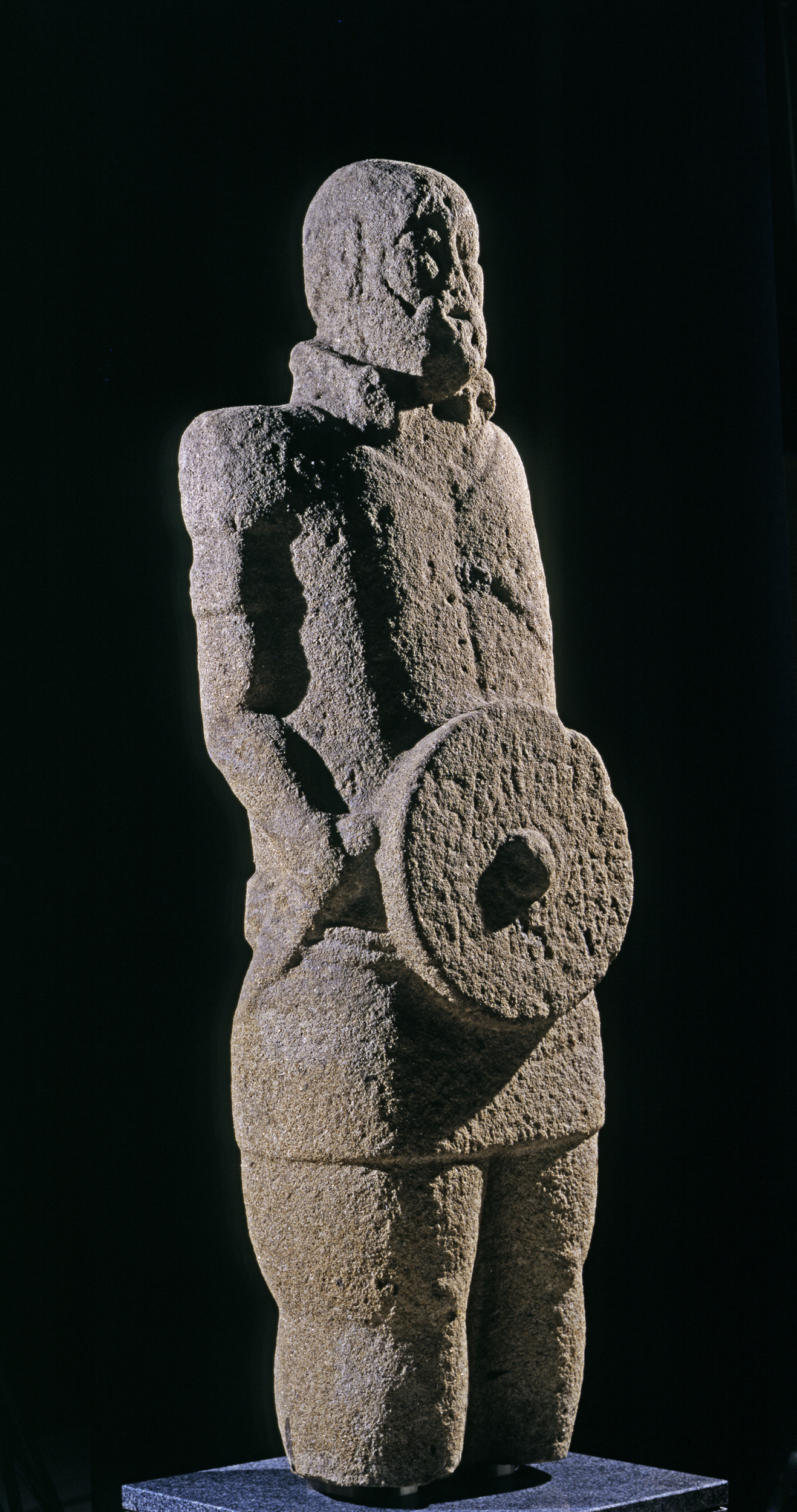
Statue of a Gallaecian Warrior, Castro Culture, 1st Century AD, north-western Iberian Peninsula (National Archaeology Museum of Portugal)

=== Second Iron Age ===
Since the beginning of the 6th century BC the Castro culture experienced an inner expansion: hundreds of new hill-forts were founded, while some older small ones were abandoned for new emplacements. These new settlements were founded near valleys, in the vicinity of the richest farmlands, and these are generally protected by several defence lines, composed of ramparts, ditches, and sound stony walls, probably built not only as a defensive apparatus but also as a feature which could confer prestige to the community. Sometimes, human remains have been found in cists or under the walls, implying some kind of foundational protective ritual.

Not only did the number of settlements grow during this period, but also their size and density. First, the old familiar huts were frequently substituted by groups of family housing, composed generally of one or more huts with a hearth, plus round granaries, and elongated or square sheds and workshops. At the same time, these houses and groups tended to occupy most of the internal area of the hill-forts, reducing the communitarian open spaces, which in turn would have been substituted by other facilities such as saunas, communitarian halls, and shared forges.

Although most of the communities of this period had self-sufficient isolated economies, one important change was the return of trade with the Mediterranean by the now independent Carthage, a thriving Western Mediterranean power. Carthaginian merchants brought imports of wine, glass, pottery and other goods through a series of emporia, commercial posts which sometimes included temples and other installations. At the same time, the archaeological register shows, through the finding of large quantities of fibulae, pins, pincers for hair extraction, pendants, earrings, torcs, bracelets, and other personal objects, the ongoing importance of the individual and his or her physical appearance. While the archaeological record of the Castro Iron Age suggests a very egalitarian society, these findings imply the development of a privileged class with better access to prestige items.

Oppida
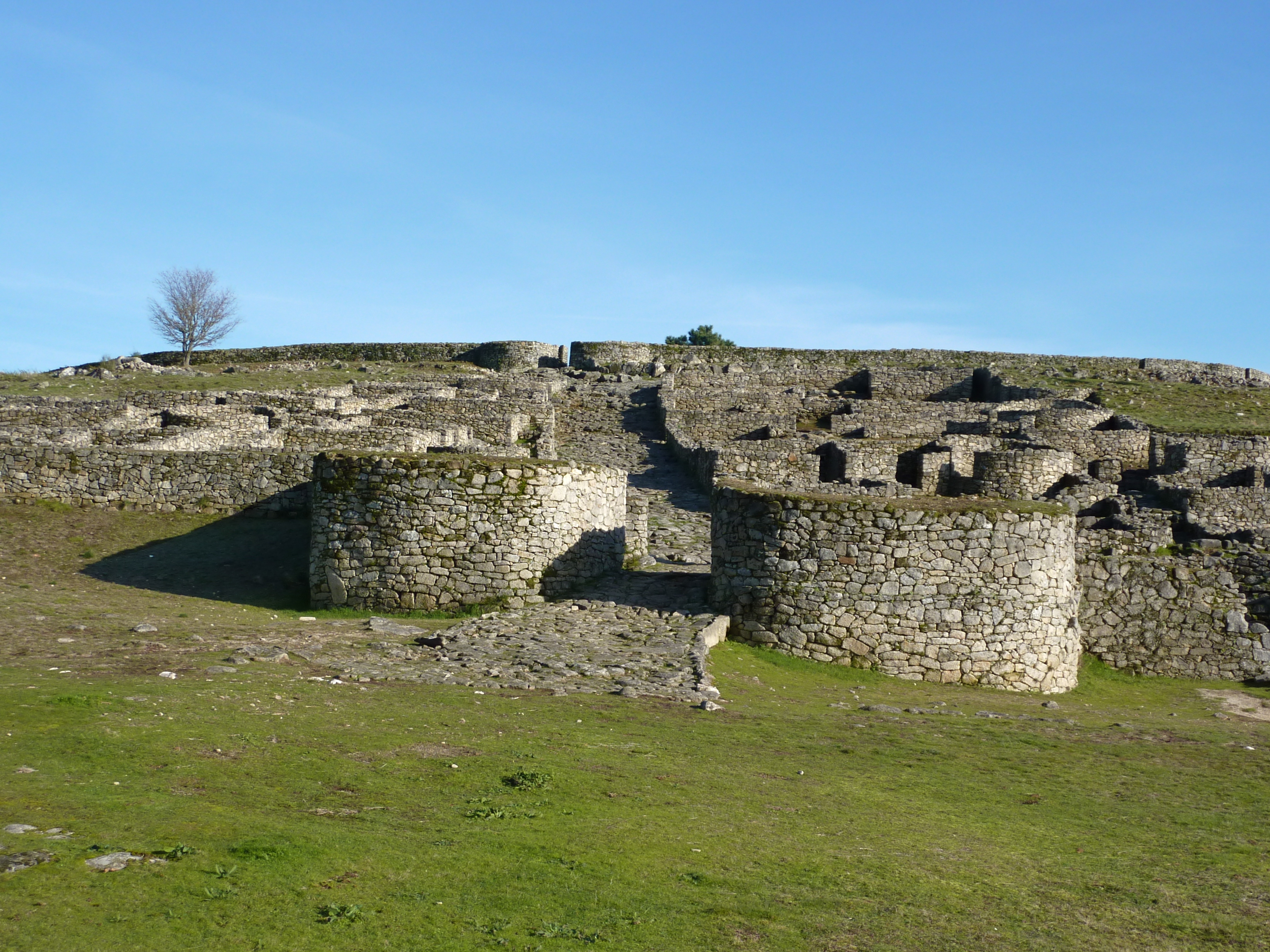
Monumental gate of the oppidum of San Cibrao de Lás (Galicia)

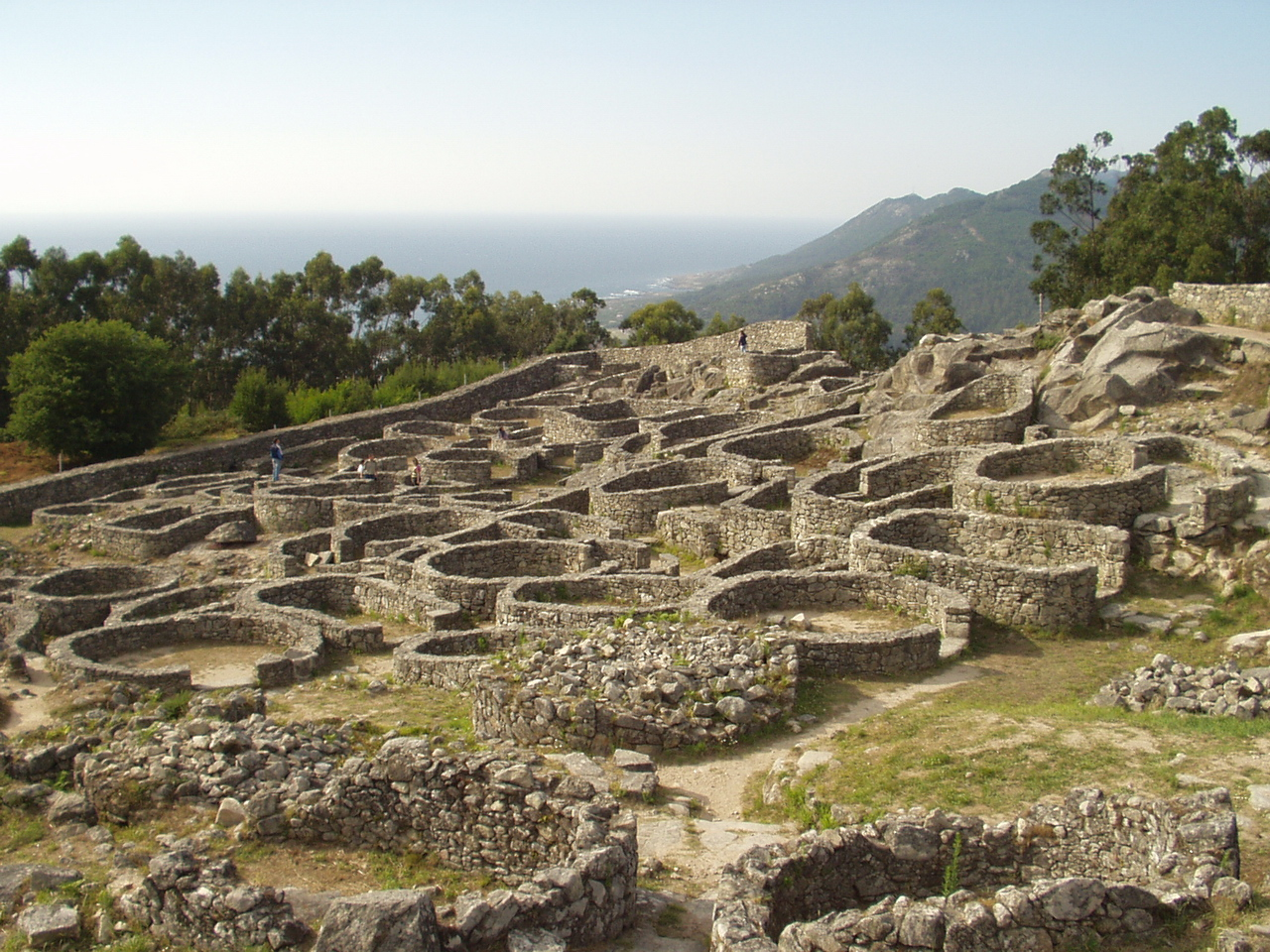
A partial view in Santa Tegra oppidum, A Guarda (Galicia)

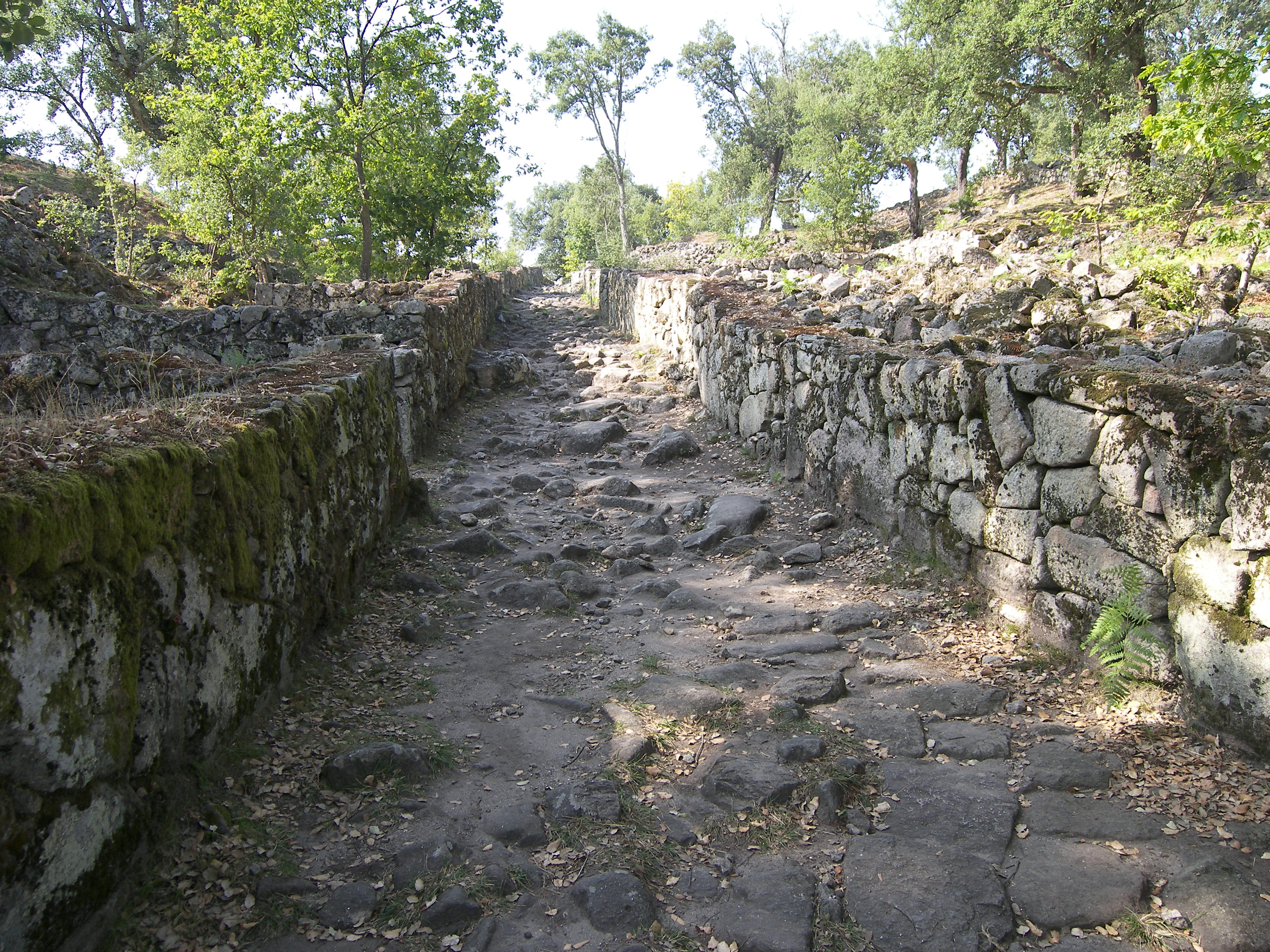
A street in Citânia de Briteiros (Norte Region)

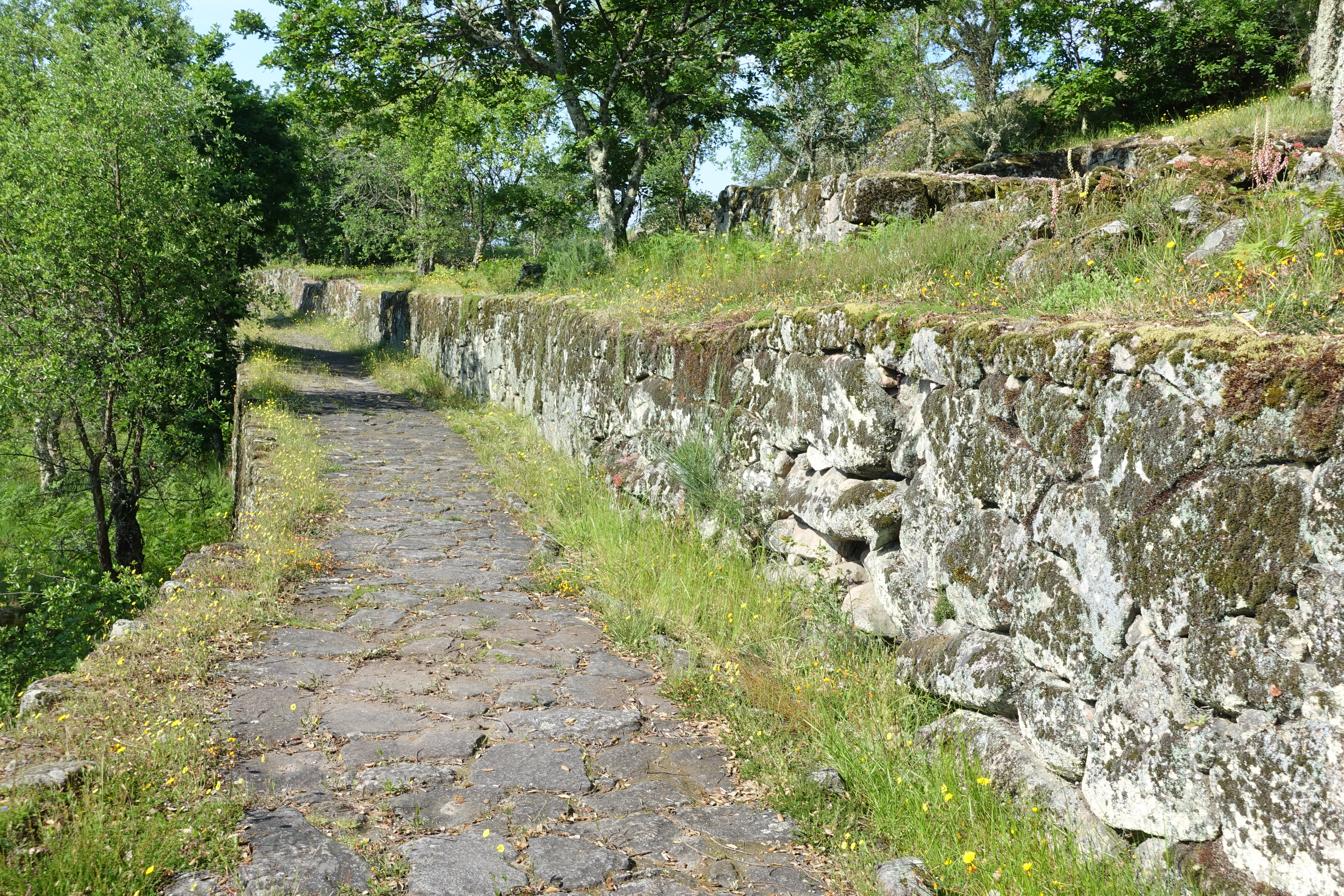
Road in Citânia de Briteiros

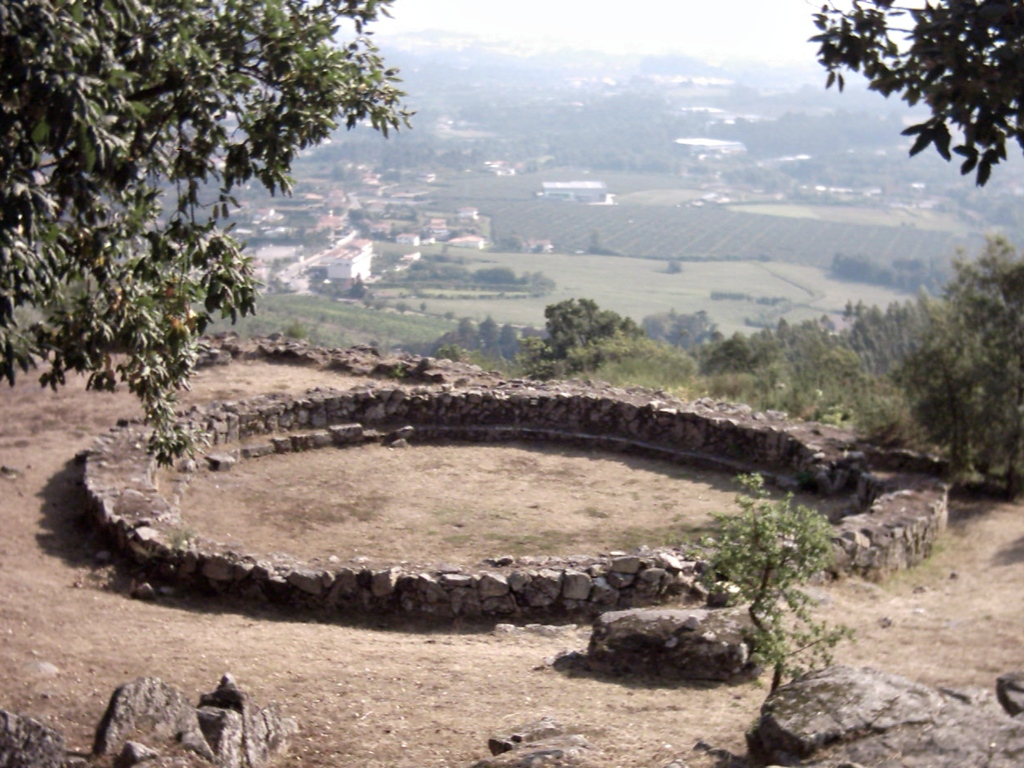
Large communitarian building with built-in bench in Citânia de Briteiros (Norte Region)

=== The oppida ===
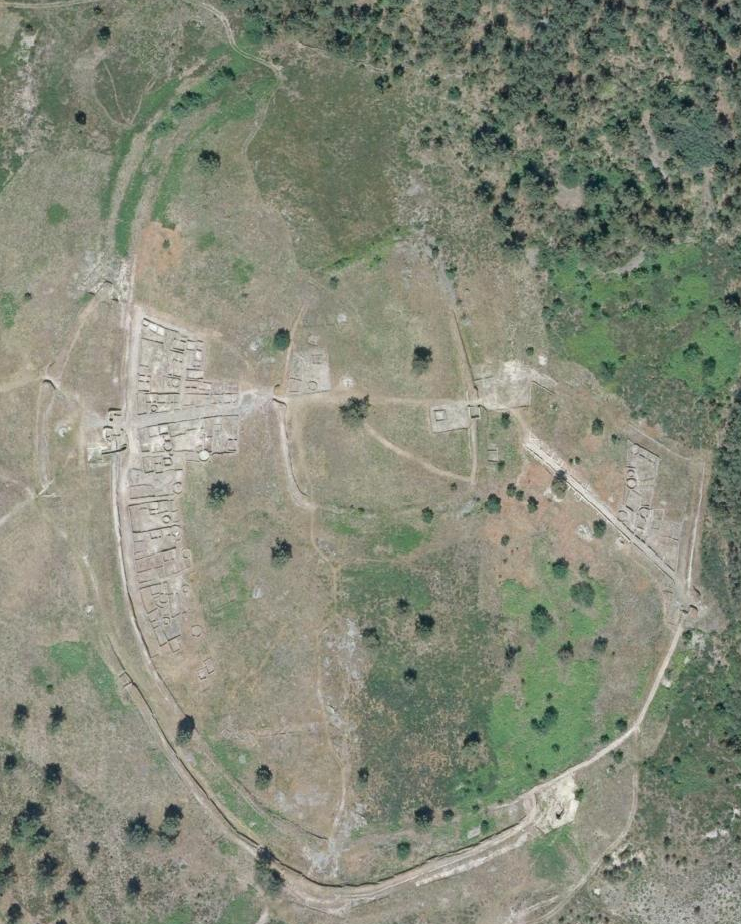
Oppidum of San Cibrao de Las (Galicia)

From the 2nd century BC, specially in the south, some of the hill-forts turned into semi-urban fortified towns, oppida; their remains are locally known as cividades or cidades, cities, with populations of some few thousand inhabitants, such as Cividade de Bagunte (50 ha), Briteiros (24 ha), Sanfins (15 ha), San Cibrao de Lás (20 ha), or Santa Tegra (15 ha); some of them were even larger than the cities, Bracara Augusti and Lucus Augusti, that Rome established a century later.

These native cities or citadels were characterised by their size and by urban features such as paved streets equipped with channels for stormwater runoff, reservoirs of potable water, and evidence of urban planning. Many of them also presented an inner and upper walled space, relatively large and scarcely urbanised, called acrópole by local scholars. These oppida were generally surrounded by concentric ditches and stone walls, up to five in Briteiros, sometimes reinforced with towers. Gates to these oppida become monumental and frequently have sculptures of warriors.

The oppida's dwelling areas are frequently externally walled, and kitchens, sheds, granaries, workshops and living rooms are ordered around an inner paved yard, sometimes equipped with fountains, drains and reservoirs.

Cividade de Bagunte (Norte Region) was one of the largest cities with 50 hectares. The cities are surrounded by a number of smaller castros, some of which may have been defensive outposts of cities, such as Castro de Laundos, that was probably an outpost of Cividade de Terroso. There is a cividade toponym in Braga, a citadel established by Augustus, although there are no archaeological findings apart from an ancient parish name and pre-Roman baths. Bracara Augusta later became the capital of the Roman province of Gallaecia, which encompassed all the lands once part of the Castro culture.

Urbanism
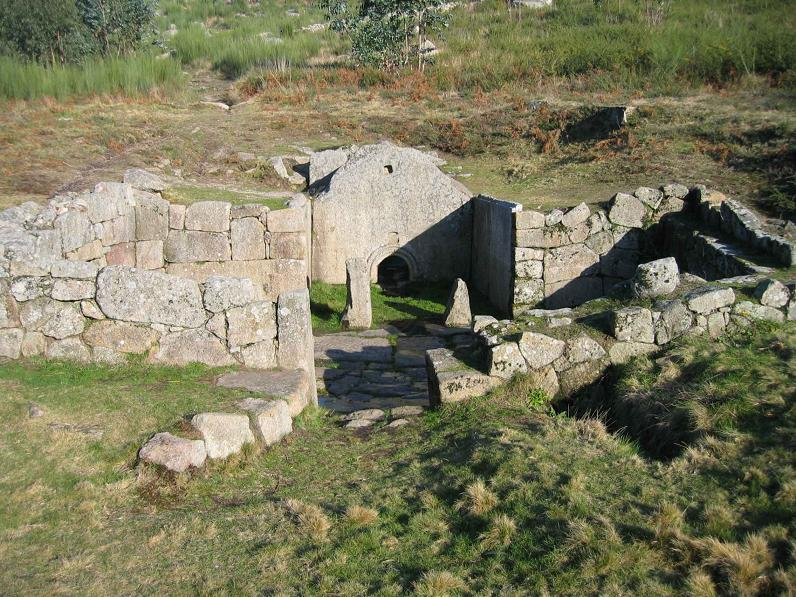
The baths of the city of Sanfins (Norte Region)

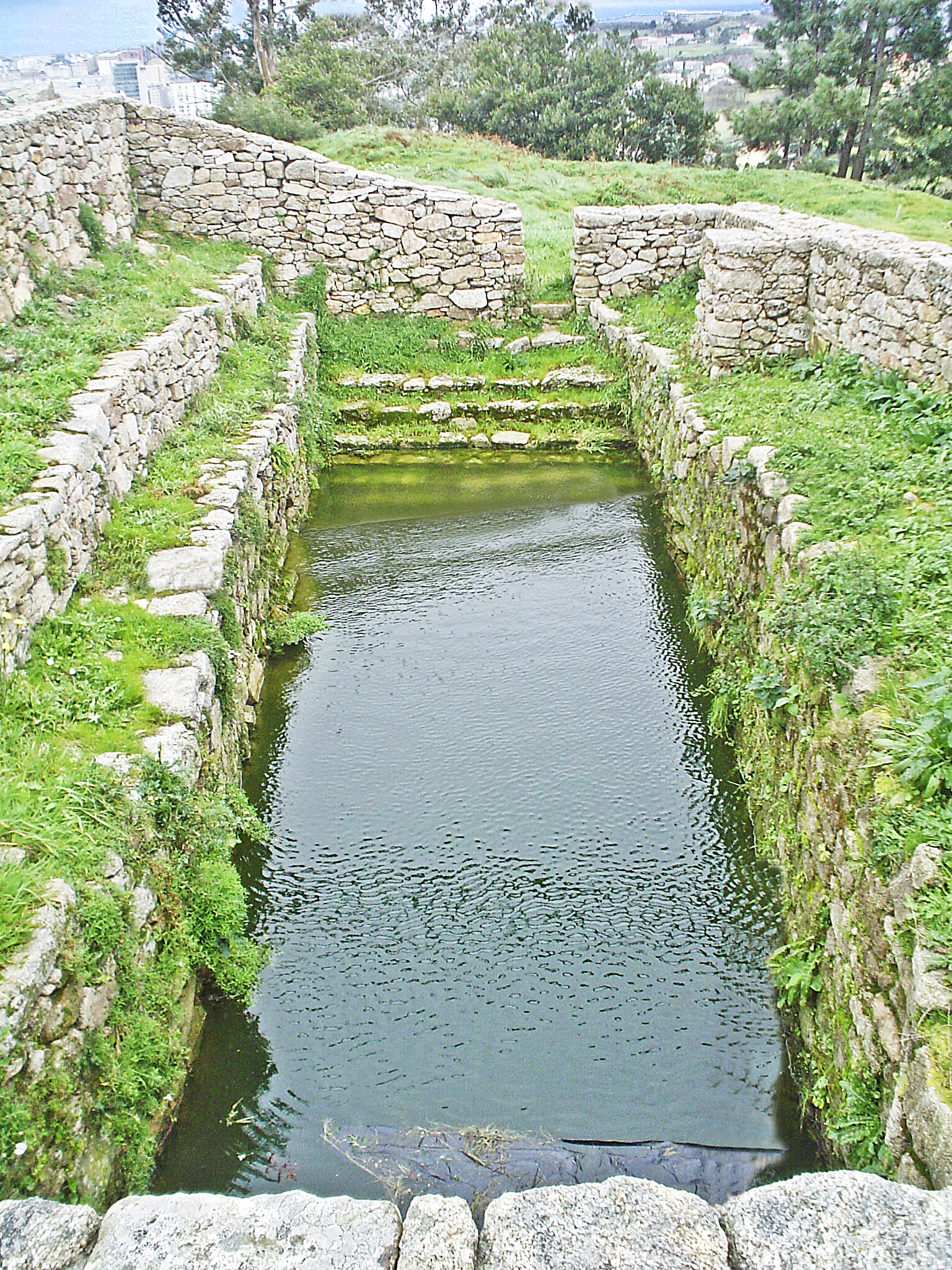
Reservoir in Elviña's hill-fort, A Coruña (Galicia)

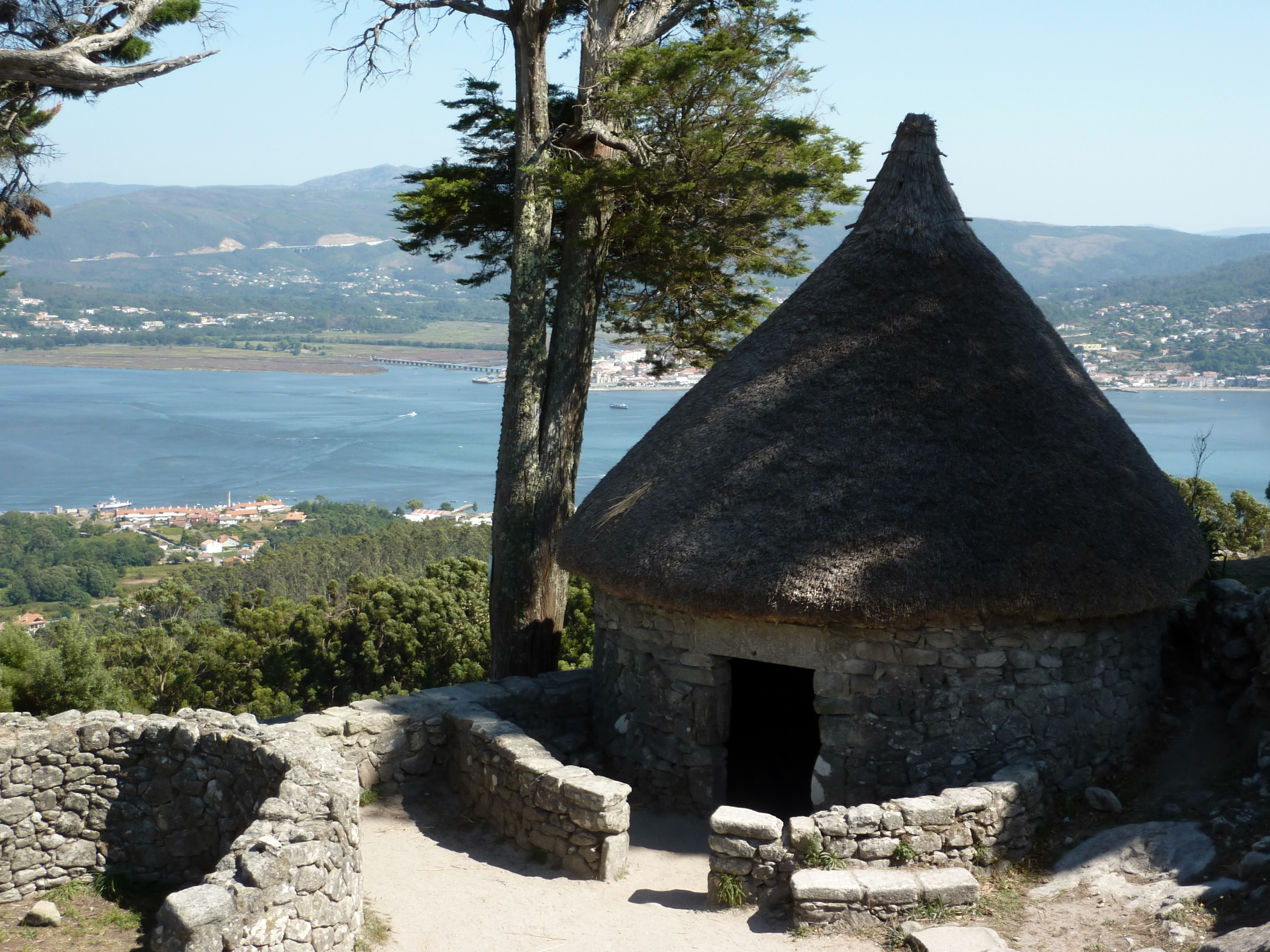
Reconstructed hut of a larger family nucleus in the Santa Tegra oppida (Galicia)

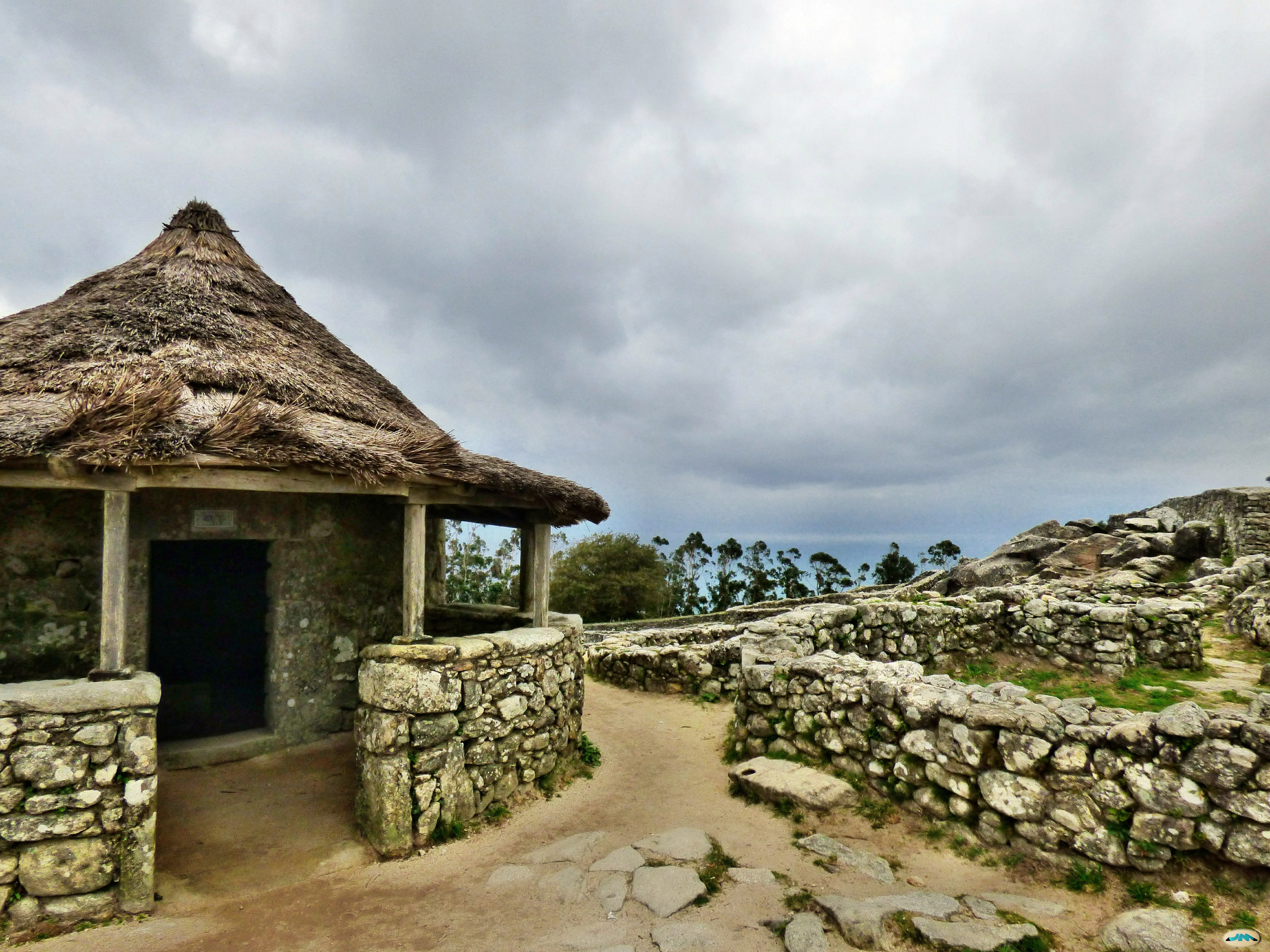
Castro of Santa Tegra

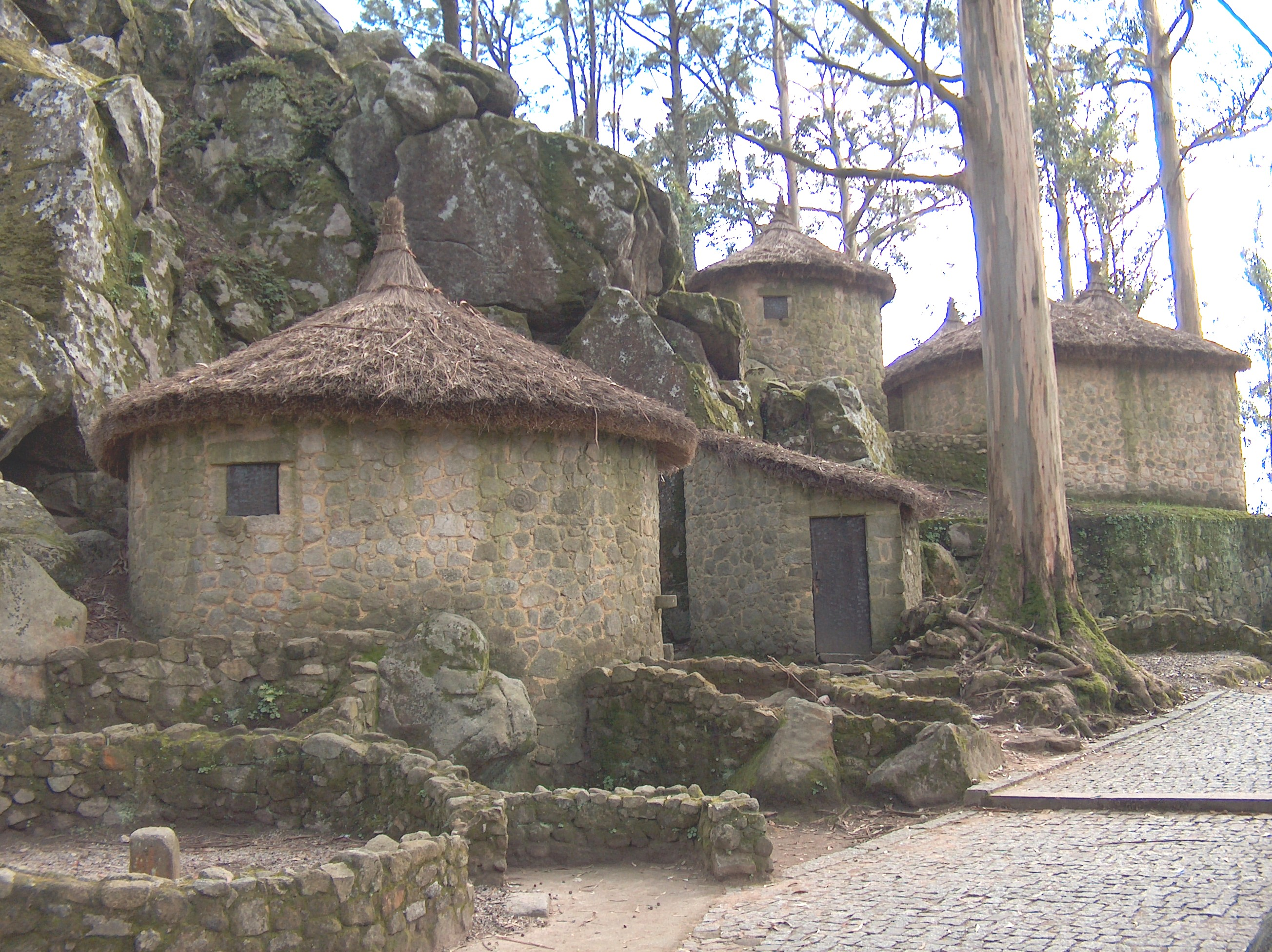
Castro of São Lourenço, Cávado

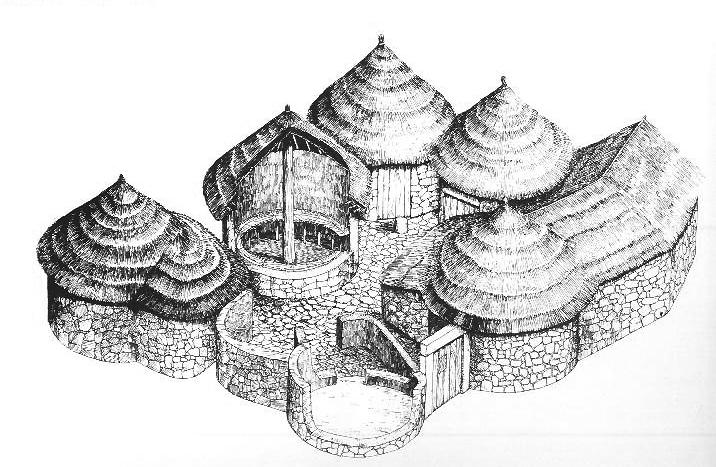
A family nucleus from Cividade de Terroso (Norte Region)

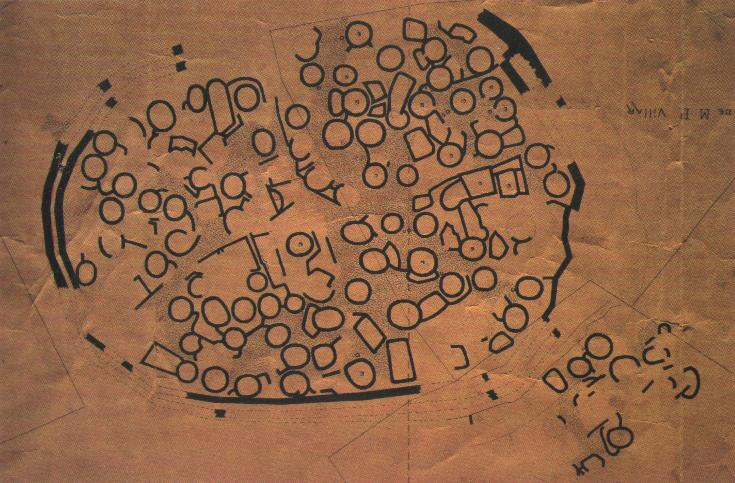
Cividade de Terroso (Norte Region)

=== Roman era ===
The first meeting of Rome with the inhabitants of the castros and cividades was during the Punic wars, when Carthaginians hired local mercenaries for fighting Rome in the Mediterranean and into Italy.

Later on, Gallaecians backed Lusitanians fighting Romans, and as a result the Roman general Decimus Junius Brutus Callaicus led a successful punishment expedition into the North in 137 BC; the victory he celebrated in Rome granted him the title Callaicus (“Galician”). During the next century Gallaecia was still theatre of operation for Perpenna (73 BC), Julius Caesar (61 BC) and the generals of Augustus (29-19 BC). But only after the Romans defeated the Asturians and Cantabrians in 19 BC is evident—through inscriptions, numismatic and other archaeological findings—the submission of the local powers to Rome.

While the 1st century BC represents an era of expansion and maturity for the Castro Culture, under Roman influence and with the local economy apparently powered more than hindered by Roman commerce and wars, during the next century the control of Roma became political and military, and for the first time in more than a millennium new unfortified settlements were established in the plains and valleys, at the same time that numerous hill-forts and cities were abandoned. Strabo wrote, probably describing this process: "until they were stopped by the Romans, who humiliated them and reduced most of their cities to mere villages" (Strabo, III.3.5).

The culture went through somewhat of a transformation, as a result of the Roman conquest and formation of the Roman province of Gallaecia in the heart of the Castro cultural area; by the 2nd century AD most hill-forts and oppida had been abandoned or reused as sanctuaries or worshipping places, but some others kept being occupied up to the 5th century, when the Germanic Suevi established themselves in Gallaecia.

== Economy and arts ==
As stated, while Bronze Age economy was based on the exploitation and exportation of mineral local resources, tin and copper and on mass production and long range distribution of prestige items, Iron Age economy was based on an economy of necessity goods, as most items and productions were obtained in situ, or interchanged thought short range commerce.

In the southern coastal areas the presence of Mediterranean merchants from the 6th century BC onward, would have occasioned an increase in social inequality, bringing many importations (fine pottery, fibulae, wine, glass and other products) and technological innovations, such as round granite millstones, which would have merged with the Atlantic local traditions.

Ancient Roman military presence in the south and east of the Iberian Peninsula since the 2nd century BC would have reinforced the role of the autochthonous warrior elites, with better access to local prestige items and importations.

Stonework
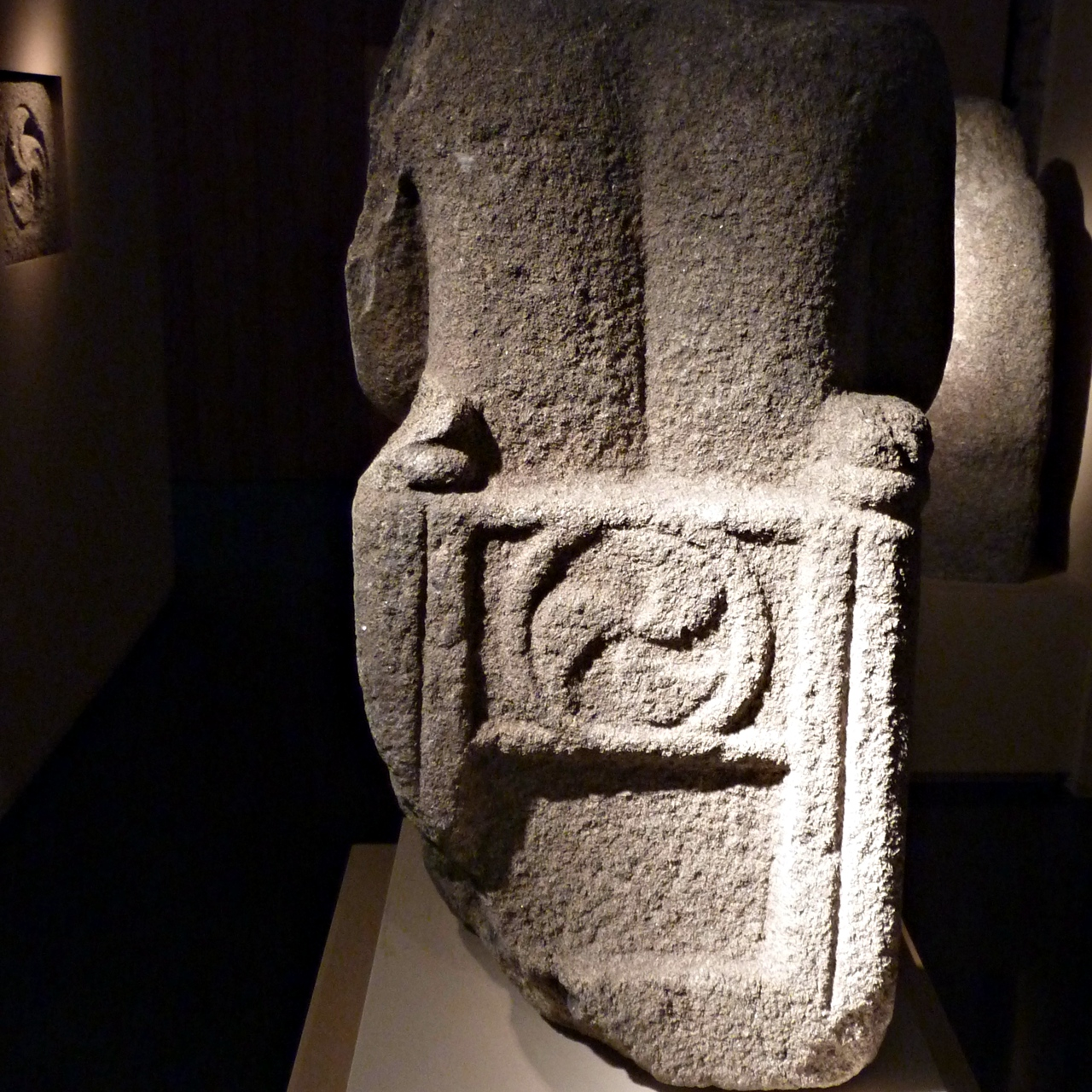
Back of a sitting statue

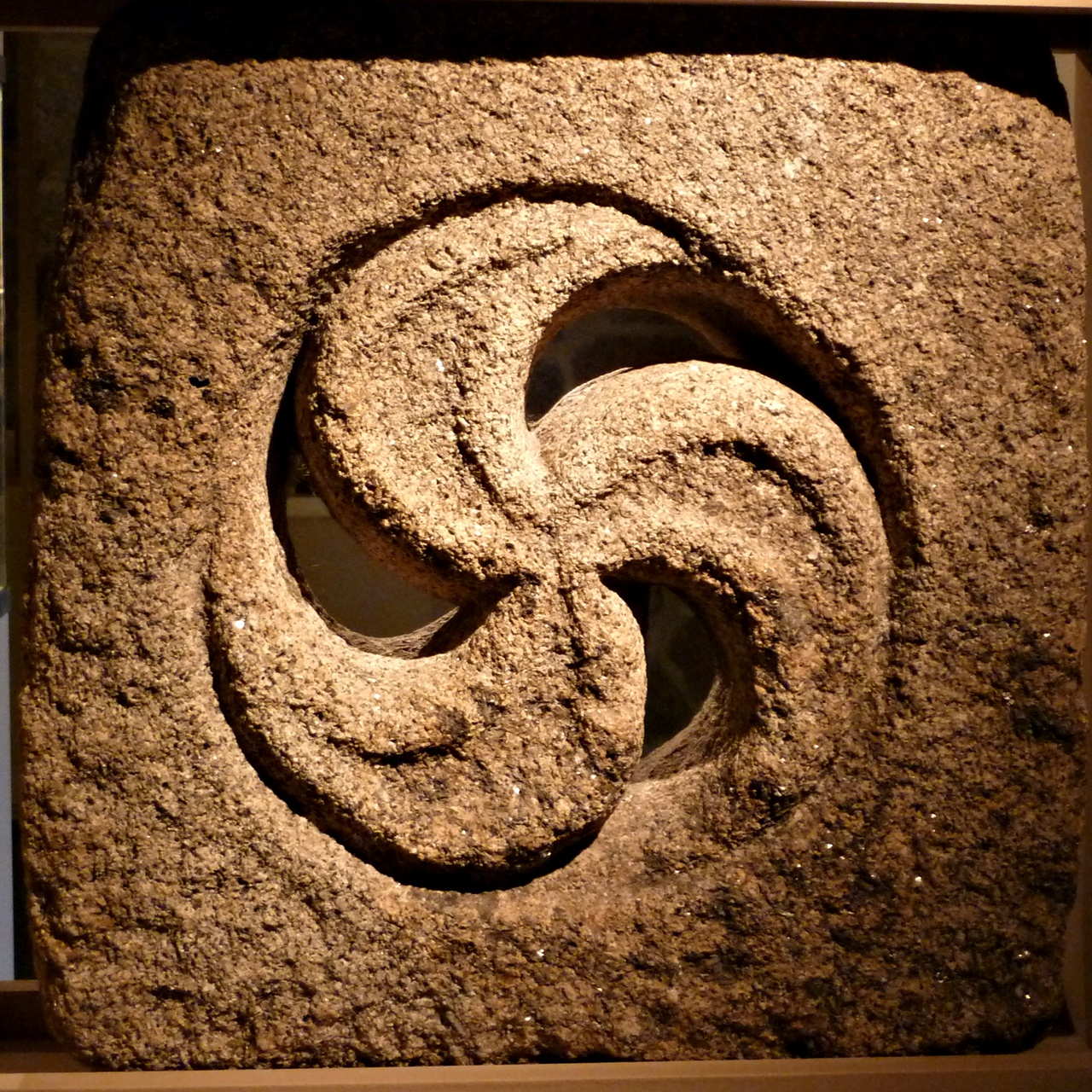
Triskelion of the oppidum of Coeliobriga (Galicia)

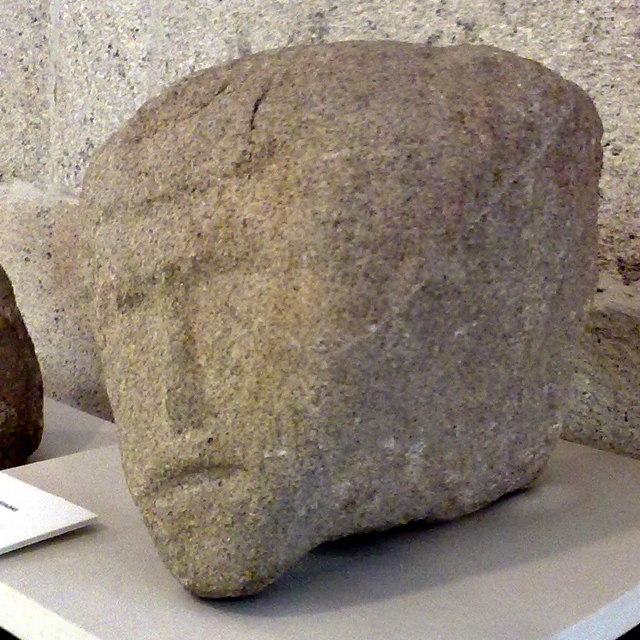
A 'severed head' carving (Galicia)

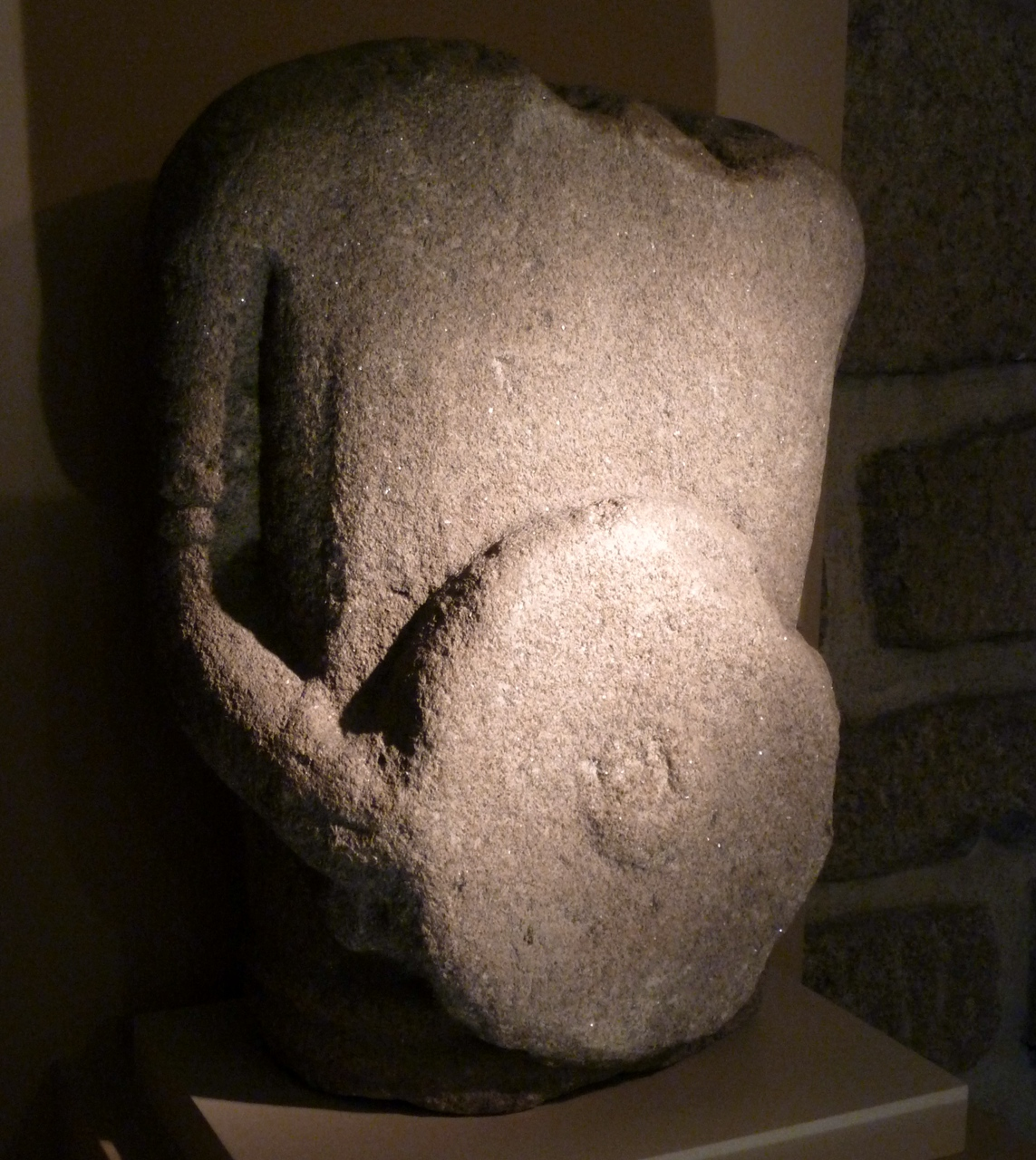
A fragmentary warrior statue (Galicia)

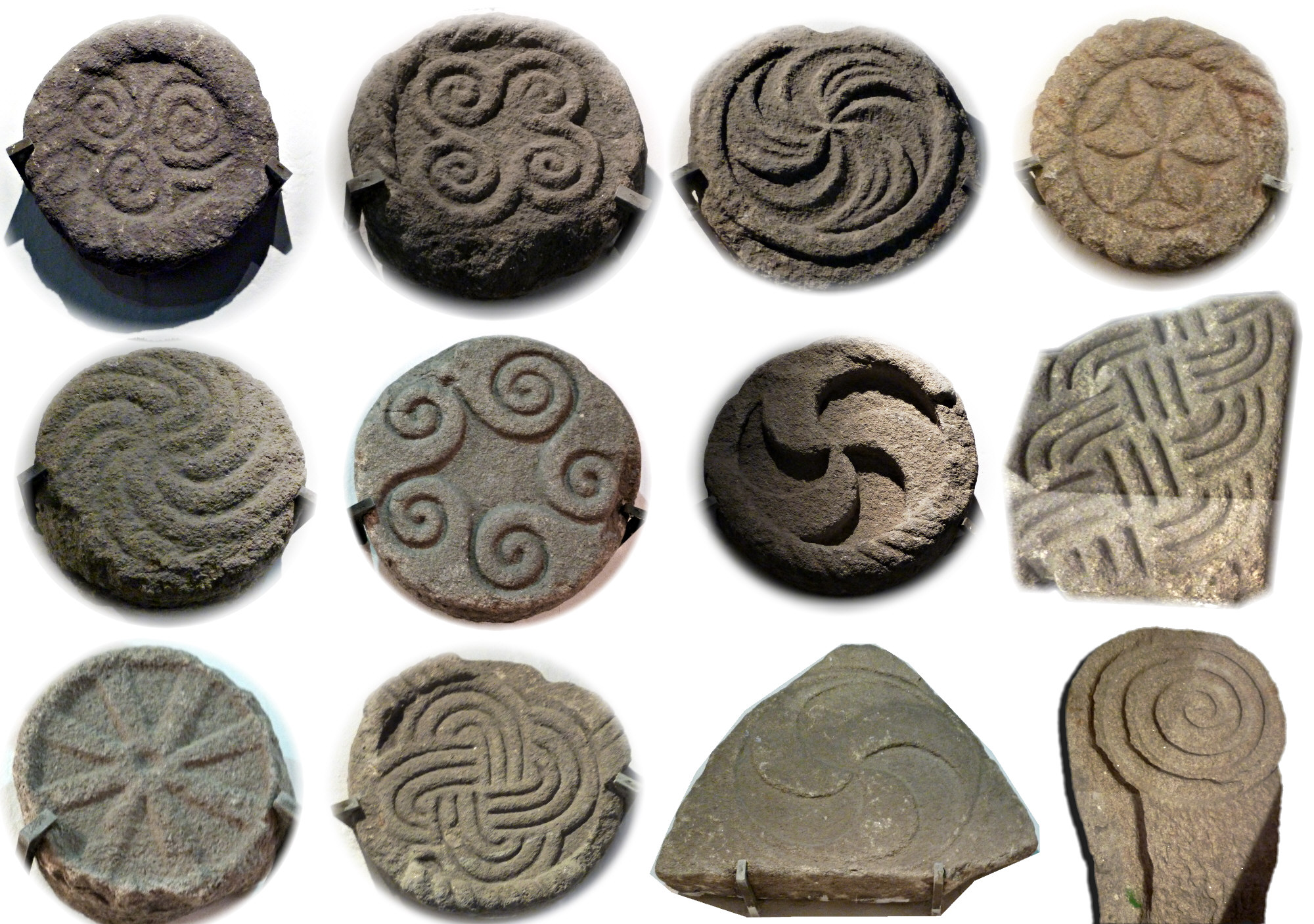
A selection of motifs and carvings from the oppida region (Galicia)

=== Food and food production ===
Pollen analysis confirms the Iron Age as a period of intense deforestation in Galicia and Northern Portugal, with meadows and fields expanding at the expense of woodland. Using three main type of tools, ploughs, sickles and hoes, together with axes for woodcutting, the Castro inhabitants grew a number of cereals: (wheat, millet, possibly also rye) for baking bread, as well as oats and barley which they also used for beer production. They also grew beans, peas and cabbage, and flax for fabric and clothes production; other vegetables were collected: nettle, watercress. Large quantities of acorns have been found hoarded in most hill-forts, as they were used for bread production once toasted and crushed in granite stone mills.

The second pillar of local economy was animal husbandry. Gallaecians bred cattle for meat, milk and butter production; they also used oxen for dragging carts and ploughs, while horses were used mainly for human transportation. They also bred sheep and goats, for meat and wool, and pigs for meat. Wild animals like deer or boars were frequently chased. In coastal areas, fishing and collecting shellfish were important activities: Strabo wrote that the people of northern Iberia used boats made of leather, probably similar to Irish currachs and Welsh coracles, for local navigation. Archaeologists have found hooks and weights for nets, as well as open seas fish remains, confirming inhabitants of the coastal areas as fishermen.

=== Metallurgy ===
Mining was an integral part of the culture, and it attracted Mediterranean merchants, first Phoenicians, later Carthaginians and Romans. Gold, iron, copper, tin and lead were the most common ores mined. Castro metallurgy refined the metals from ores and cast them to make various tools.

During the initial centuries of the first millennium BC, bronze was still the most used metal, although iron was progressively introduced. The main products include tools (sickles, hoes, ploughs, axes), domestic items (knives and cauldrons), and weapons (antenna swords, spearheads). During the initial Iron Age, the local artisans stopped producing some of the most characteristic Bronze Age items such as carp tongue, leaf-shaped and rapier swords, double-ringed axes, breastplates and most jewellery. From this time, the Castro culture develops jewellery of the Hallstatt type, but with a distinctive Mediterranean influence, especially in the production of feminine jewellery. Some 120 gold torcs are known, produced in three main regional styles frequently having large, void terminals, containing little stones which allowed them to be also used as rattles. Other metal artefacts include antenna-hilted swords and knives, Montefortino helmets with local decoration and sacrificial or votive axes with depictions of complex sacrificial scenes (similar to classical suovetaurilia), with torcs, cauldrons, weapons, animals of diverse species and string-like motifs.

Decorative motifs include rosettes, triskelions, swastikas, spirals, interlaces, as well as palm tree, herringbone and string motifs, many of which were still carved in Romanesque churches, and are still used today in local folk art and traditional items in Galicia, Portugal and northern Spain. These same motifs were also extensively used in stone decoration. Castro sculpture also reveals that locals carved these figures in wood items, such as chairs, and wove them into their clothes.

Metallurgy
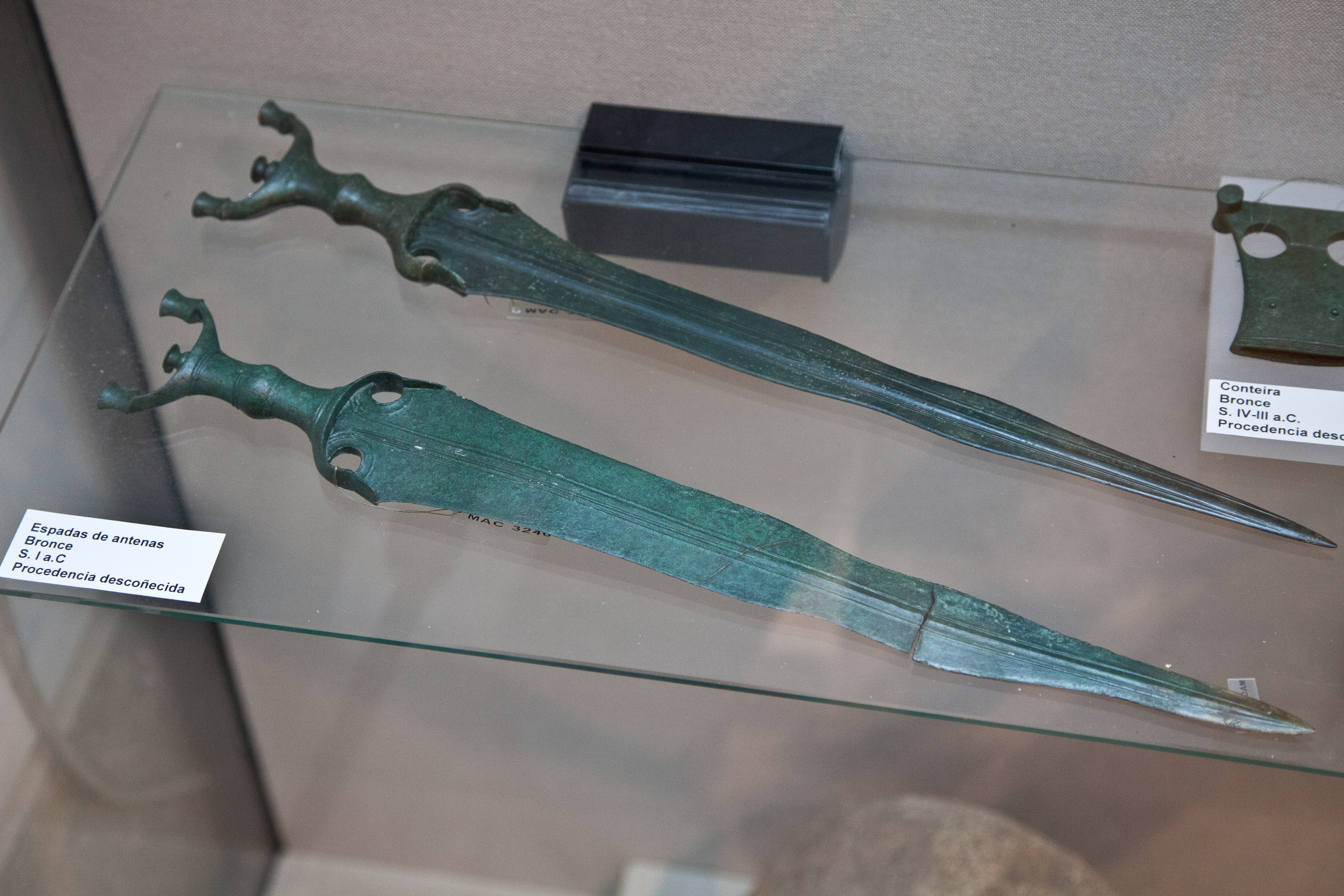
Bronze swords (Galicia)

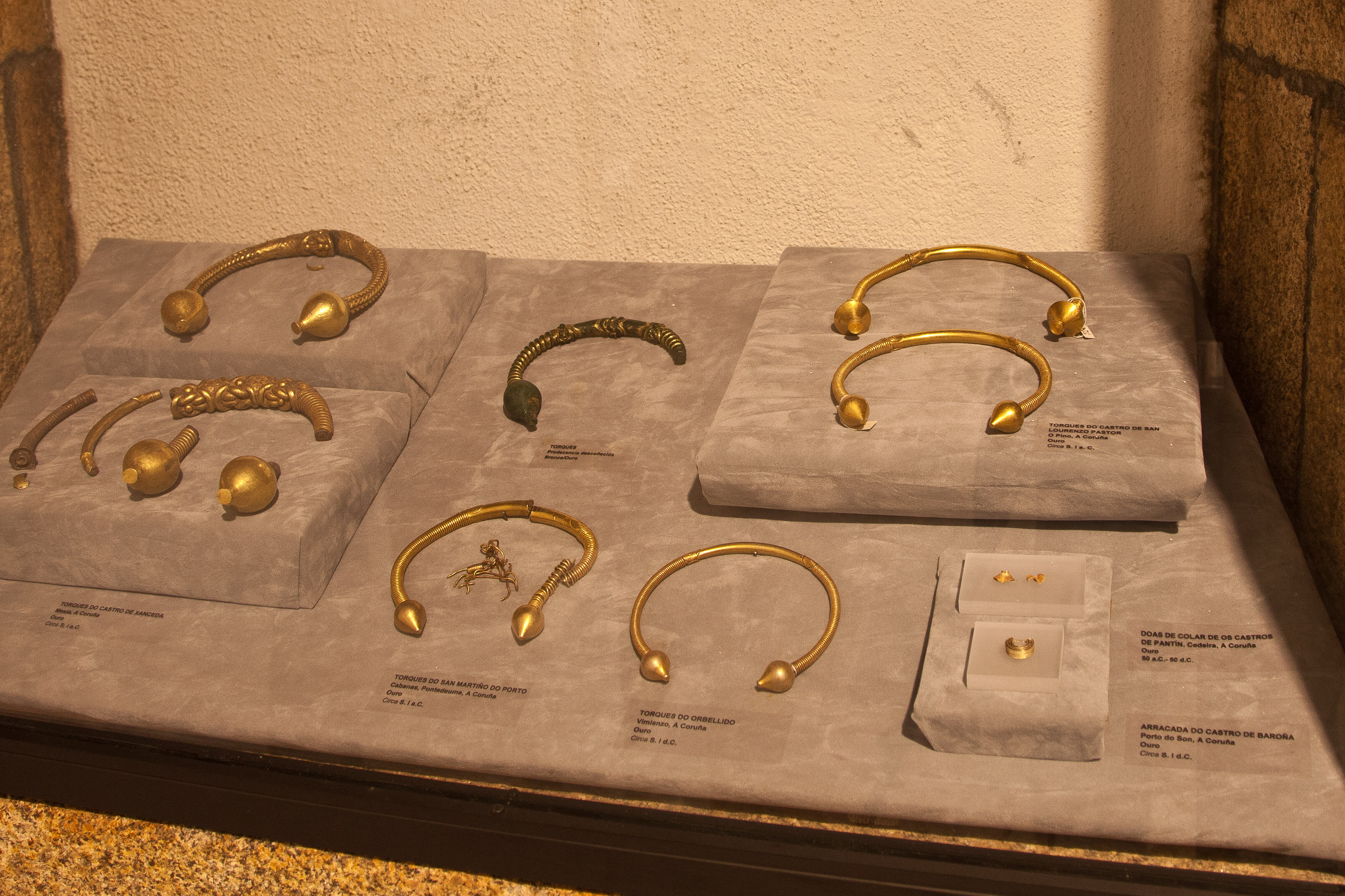
Torcs from northern Galicia

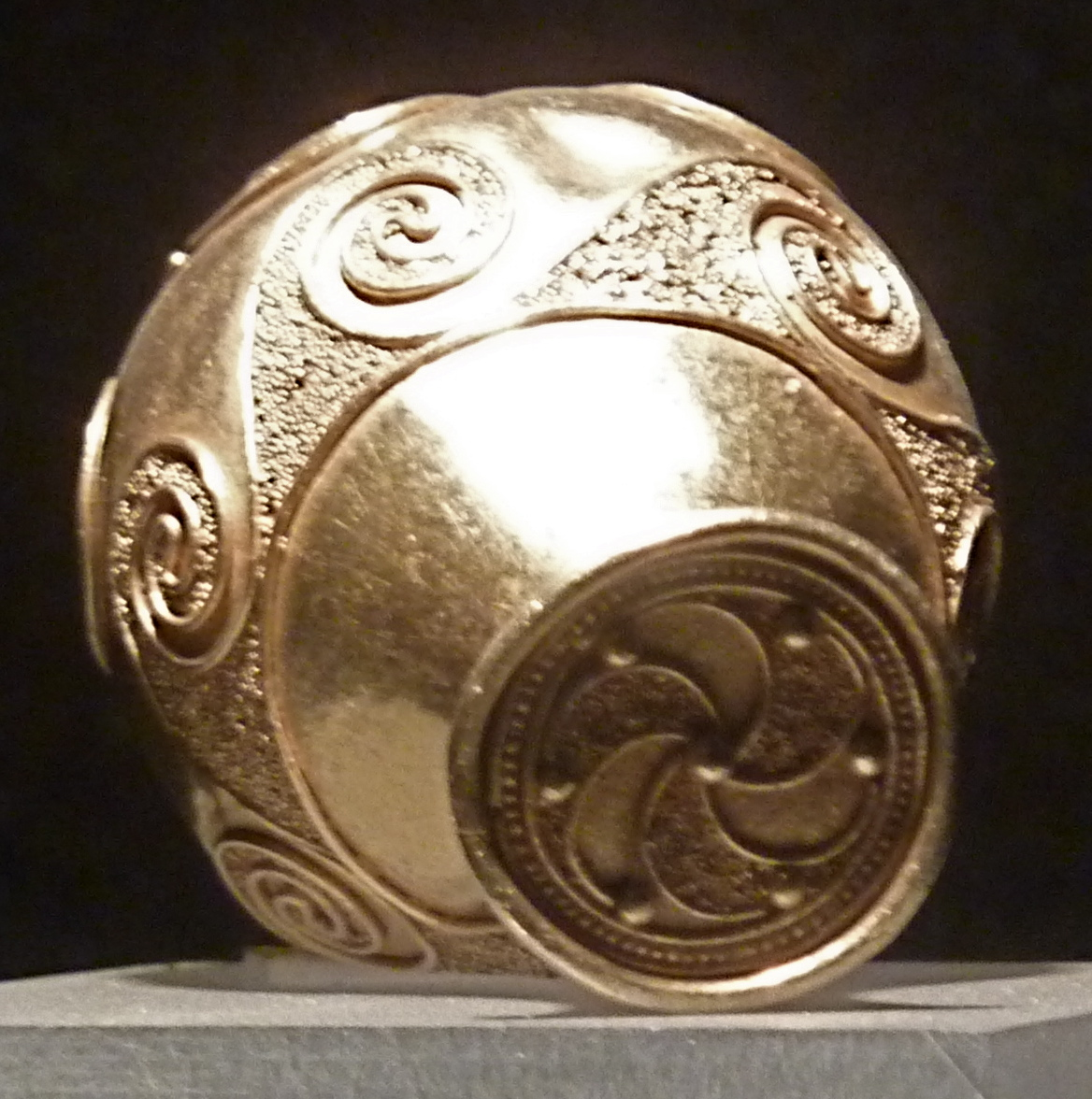
Torc terminal from the oppidum of Santa Tegra, A Guarda (Galicia)

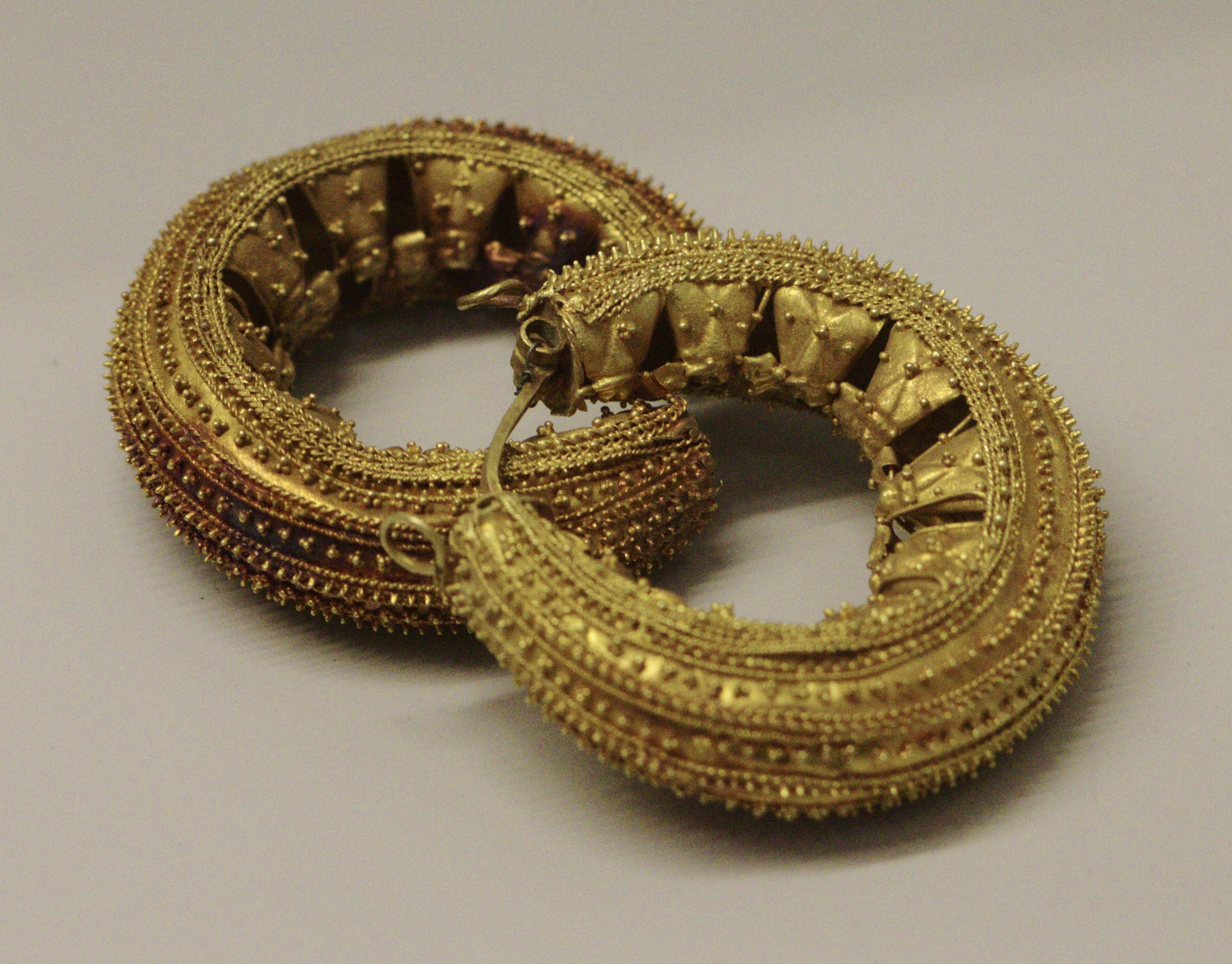
Castro style pendant earrings from the "Tesouro Bedoya", found near Ferrol (Galicia)

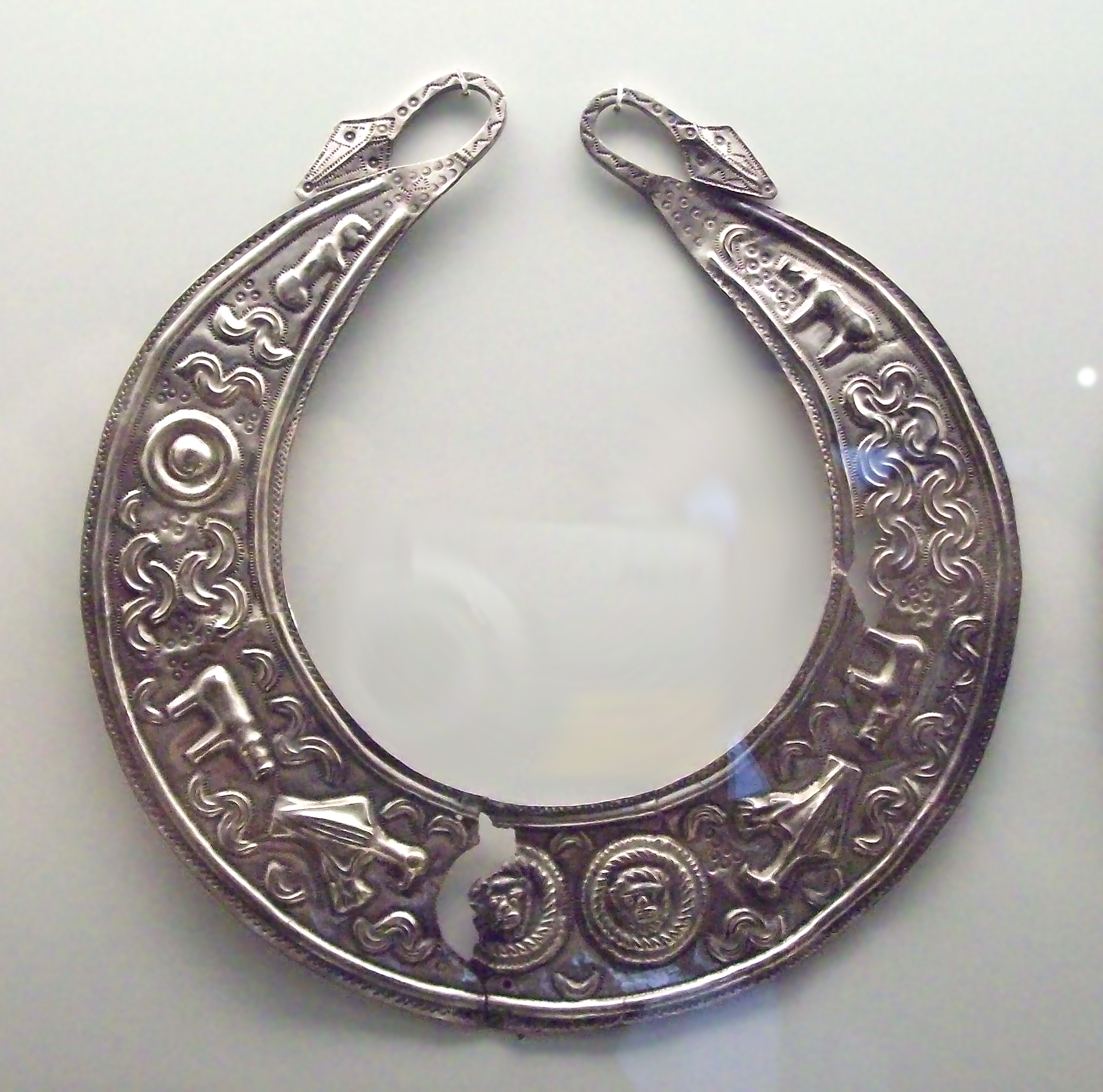
Lunula from Chão de Lamas, Coimbra (Central Portugal)

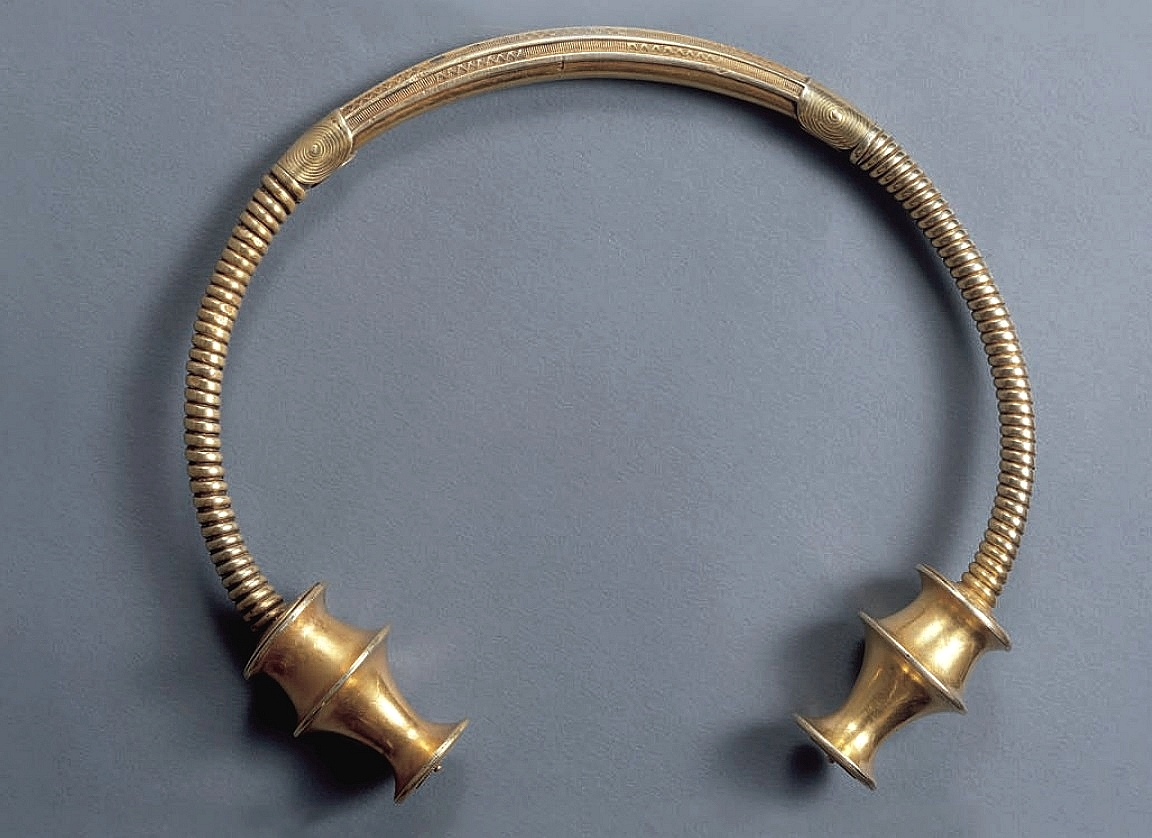
Torc from Langreo, Asturias

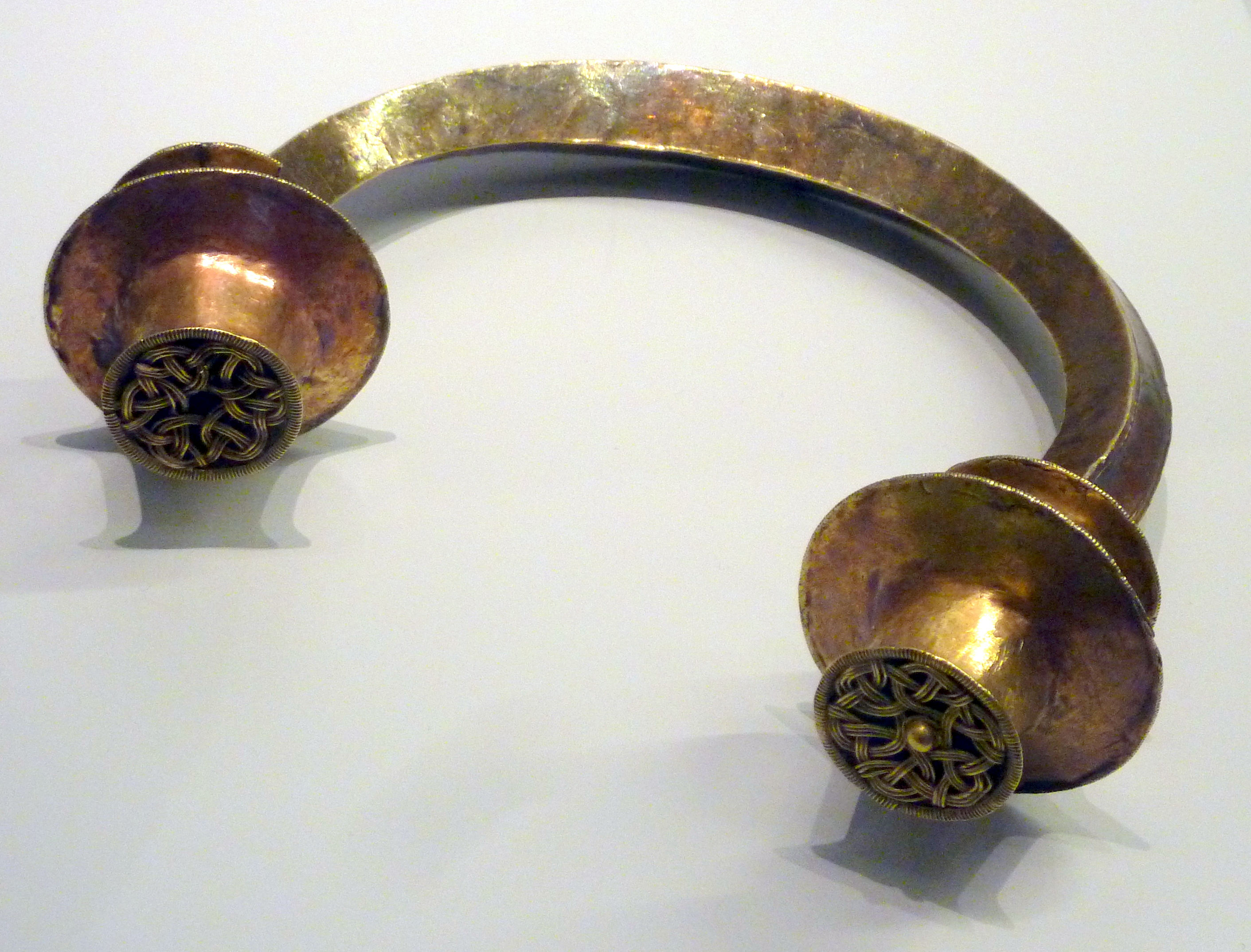
Torc from Foxados, Museo de Pontevedra, Galicia

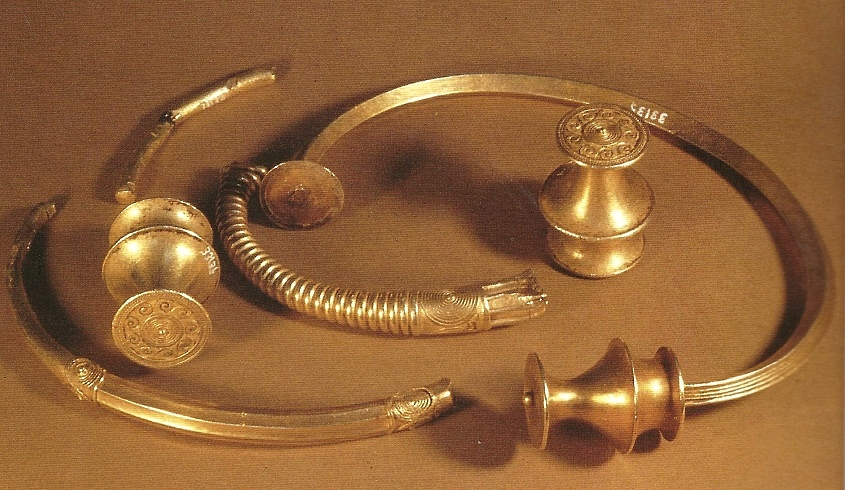
Torcs from Cangas de Onis, Asturias

=== Stonework ===
While the use of stone for constructions is an old tradition in the Castro culture, dating from the 1st centuries of the 1st millennium BC, sculpture only became usual from the 2nd century BC, specially in the southern half of the territory, associated to the oppida. Five main types are produced, all of them in granite stone:

- Guerreiros or 'Warrior statues', usually representing a male warrior in a standing pose, holding ready a short sword and a caetra (small local shield), and wearing a cap or helmet, torc, viriae (bracelets) and decorated shirt, skirt and belt.
- Sitting statues: They usually depicts what is considered to be a god sitting on a decorated throne, wearing viriae or bracelets, and holding a cup or pot. Although the motives are autochthonous, their model are clearly Mediterranean; nevertheless, unlike the Gallaecian ones, the Iberian sitting statues usually depicts goddesses. Some few statues of feminine divinities are also known representing a standing nude woman only wearing a torc, as the male warrior statues.
- Severed heads: similar to the têtes coupées from France; they represent dead heads, and were usually located in walls of ancient hill-forts, and are still found reused near of them. Unlike all the other types, these are more common in the north.
- Pedras formosas (literally 'beauty stones'), or elaborated and sculpted slabs used inside saunas, as door frame of the inner room.
- Architectural decoration: The houses of the oppida of southern Galicia and northern Portugal frequently contains architectural elements engraved with geometric auspicious motives: rosettes, triskelions, wheels, spirals, swastikas, string like and interlaced designs, among others.

Pedra Formosa Stonework
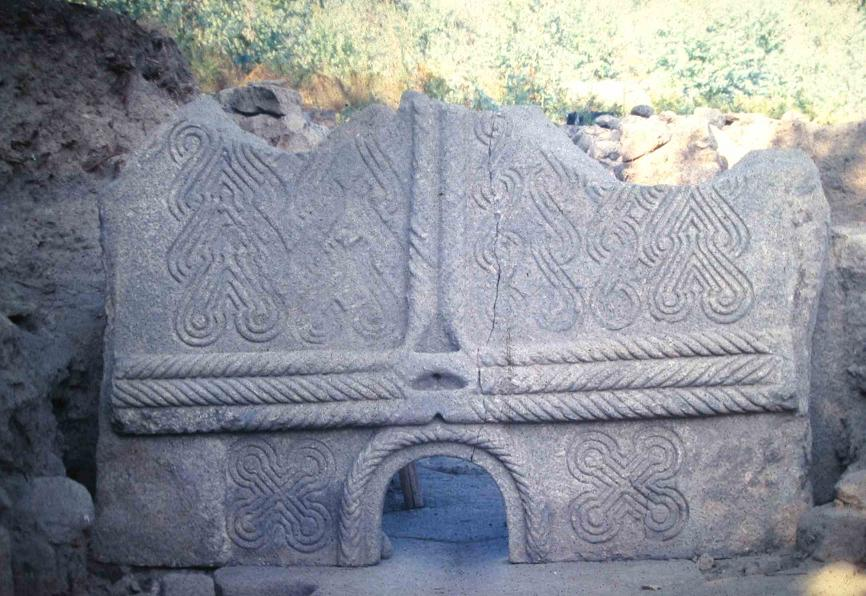
Pedra Formosa, Castro das Eiras, Vila Nova de Famalicão. (Norte Region)

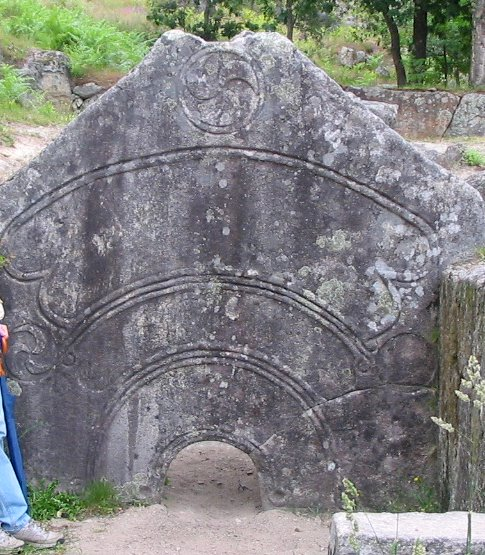
Pedra Formosa, Citânia de Briteiros.(Norte Region)

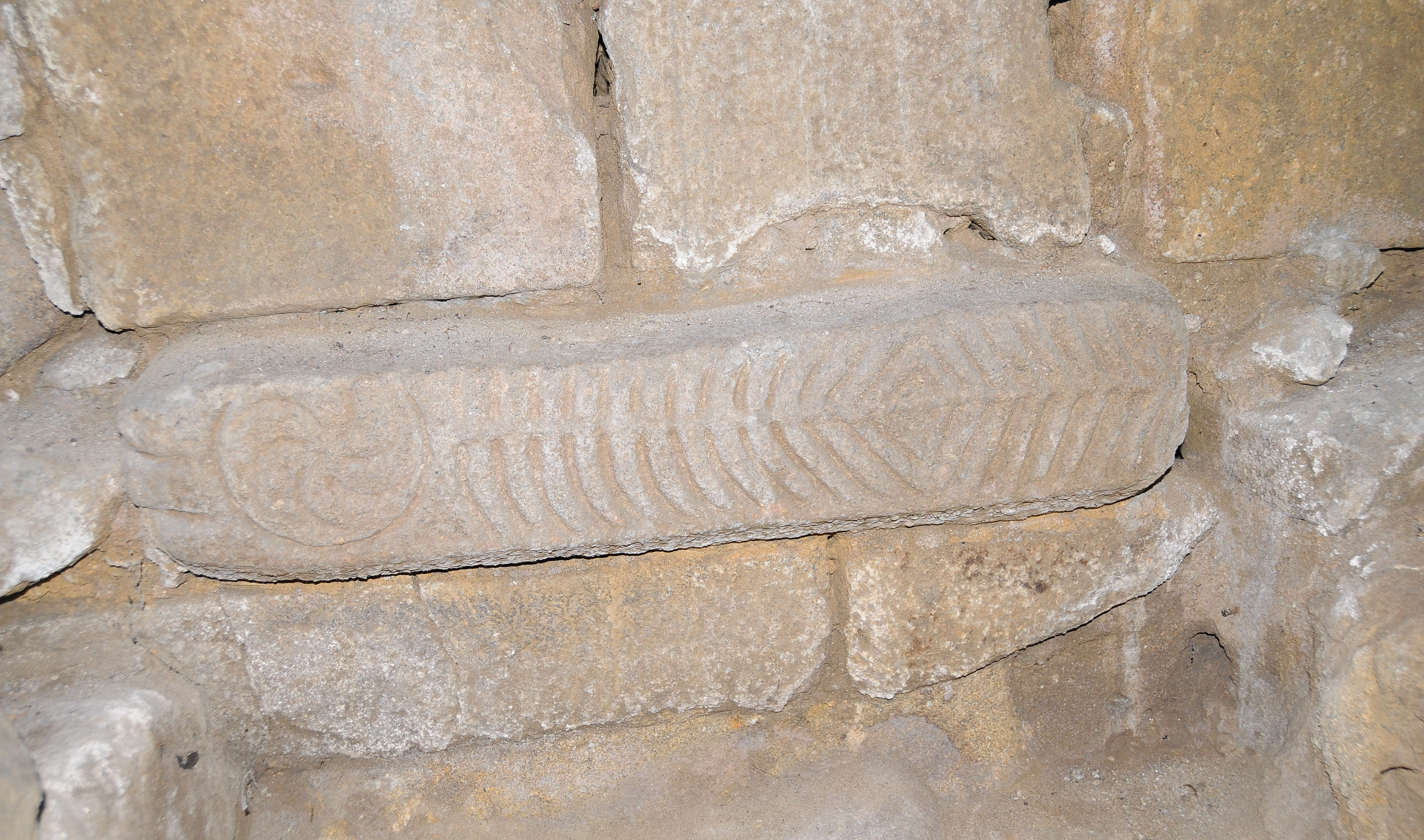
A sculpted stone reused in a 6th-century Suevic church in Dume, Braga (Norte Region)

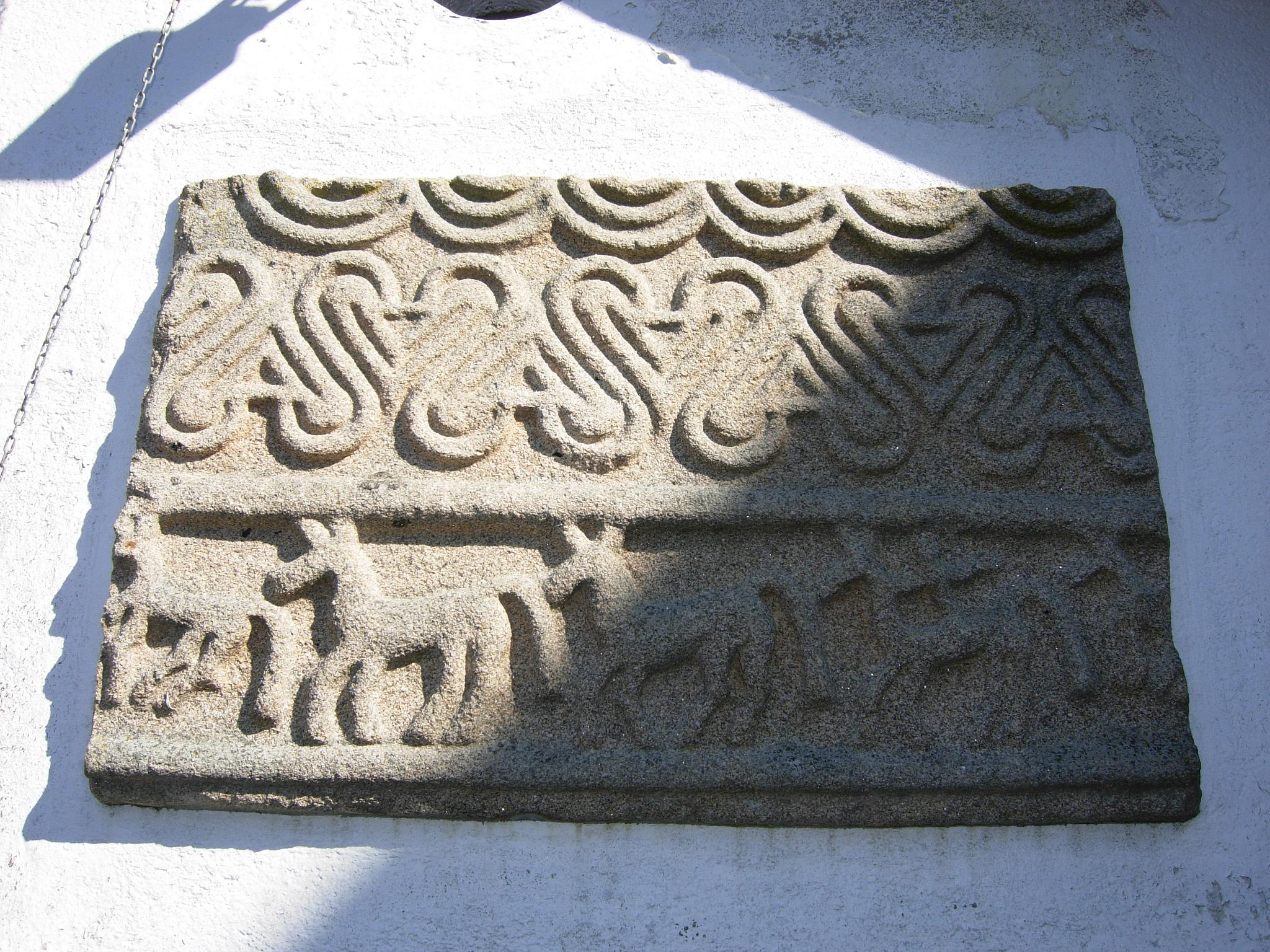
Old reused stone slab, now in exposition in Formigueiros, Amoeiro, Galicia

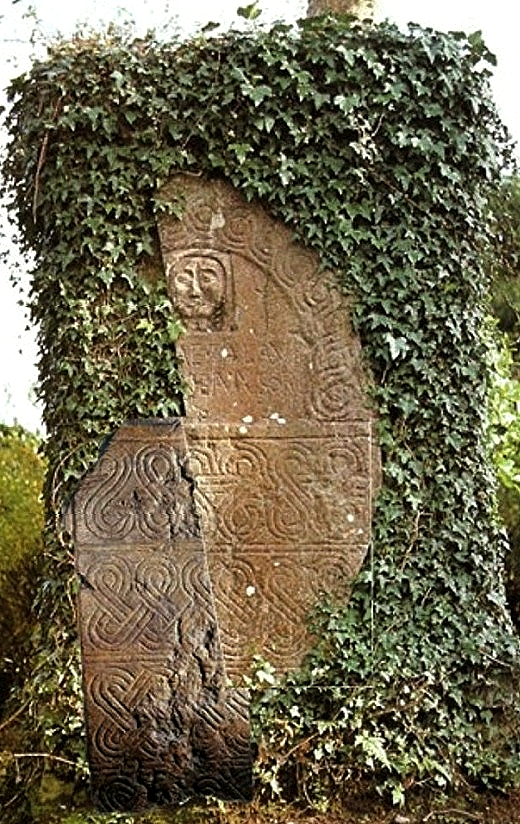
Funeral tombstone from Doriga, Asturias.

=== Pottery and other crafts ===
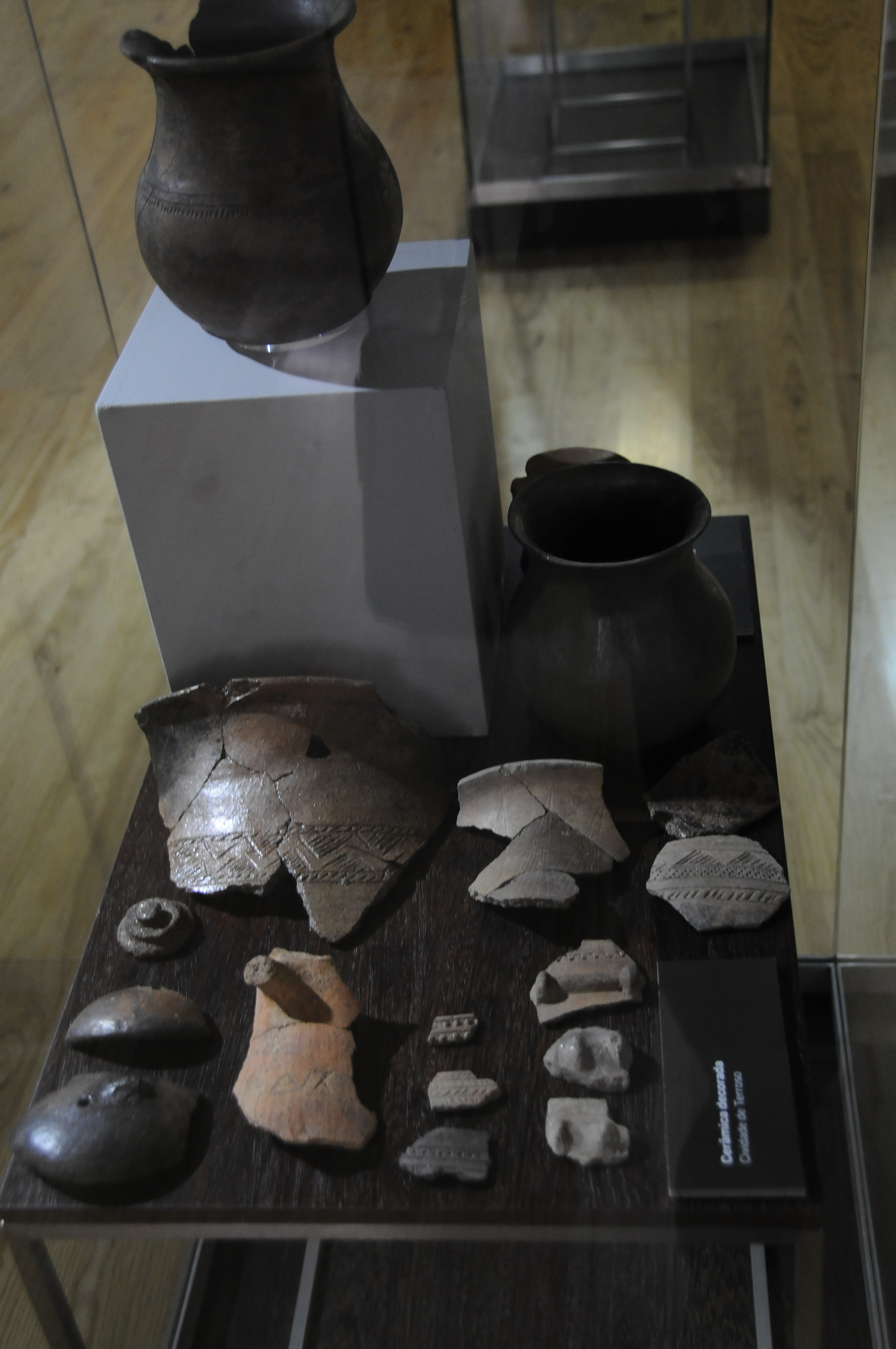
Pottery from Cividade de Terroso, Norte Region

Pottery was produced locally in a variety of styles, although wealthier people also possessed imported Mediterranean products. The richest pottery was produced in the south, from the Rias Baixas region in Galicia to the Douro, where decoration was frequently stamped and incised into pots and vases. The patterns used often revealed the town where these were produced.

== Language, society and religion ==
=== Society and government ===
In the 1st century AD, more than 700,000 people were living in the main area of the Castro culture, in hill forts and oppida. Northern Gallaeci (Lucenses) were divided into 16 populi or peoples: Lemavi, Albiones, Cibarci, Egivarri Namarini, Adovi, Arroni, Arrotrebae, Celtici Neri, Celtici Supertamarci, Copori, Celtici Praestamarci, Cileni, Seurri, Baedui. Astures were divided in Augustani and Transmontani, comprising 22 populi: Gigurri, Tiburi, Susarri, Paesici, Lancienses, Zoelae, among others. Southern Gallaecians (Bracareses), comprising the area of the oppida, were composed of 24 civitates: Helleni, Grovi, Leuni, Surbi, Bracari, Interamnici, Limici, Querquerni, Coelerni, Tamagani, Bibali, Callaeci, Equasei, Caladuni...

Each populi or civitas was composed of a number of castella, each one comprehending one or more hill-forts or oppida, by themselves an autonomous political chiefdom, probably under the direction of a chief and a senate. Under Roman influence the peoples or populi apparently ascended to a major role, at the expense of the minor entities. From the beginning of our era a few Latin inscriptions are known where some individuals declare themselves princeps or ambimogidus of a certain populi or civitas.

=== Onomastics and languages ===
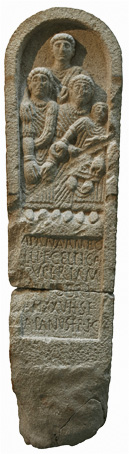
Tombstone of Apana Ambolli, a woman of the Celtici Supertamarici, from Miobri (hill-fort). Galicia.

The name of some of the castles and oppida are known through the declaration of origin of persons mentioned in epitaphs and votive Latin inscriptions (Berisamo, Letiobri, Ercoriobri, Louciocelo, Olca, Serante, Talabriga, Aviliobris, Meidunio, Durbede..), through the epithets of local Gods in votive altars (Alaniobrica, Berubrico, Aetiobrigo, Viriocelense...), and the testimony of classic authors and geographers (Adrobrica, Ebora, Abobrica, Nemetobriga, Brigantium, Olina, Caladunum, Tyde, Glandomirum, Ocelum...). Some more names can be inferred from modern place names, as those containing an evolution of the Celtic element brigs meaning "hill" and characteristically ligated to old hill-forts (Tragove, O Grove < Ogrobre, Canzobre < Caranzobre, Cortobe, Lestrove, Landrove, Iñobre, Maiobre...) Approximately half the pre-Latin toponyms of Roman Gallaecia were Celtic, while the rest were either non Celtic western Indo-European, or mixed toponyms containing Celtic and non-Celtic elements.

On the local personal names, less than two hundred are known, many of which are also present either in the Lusitania, or either among the Astures, or among the Celtiberians. Whilst many of them have a sure Celtic etymology, frequently related to war, fame or valour, others show preservation of /p/ and so are probably Lusitanian better than properly Celtic; in any case, many names could be Celtic or Lusitanian, or even belong to another indo-European local language. Among the most frequent names are Reburrus, Camalus (related to Old Irish cam 'battle, encounter'), Caturus (to Celtic *katu- 'fight'), Cloutius (to Celtic *klouto- 'renown', with the derivatives Clutamus 'Very Famous' and Cloutaius, and the composite Vesuclotus '(He who have) Good Fame'), Medamus, Boutius, Lovesius, Pintamus, Ladronus, Apilus, Andamus (maybe to Celtic and-amo- 'The Undermost'), Bloena, Aebura/Ebura, Albura, Arius, Caelius and Caelicus (to Celtic *kaylo- 'omen'), Celtiatis, Talavius, Viriatus, among others.

A certain number of personal names are also exclusive to Gallaecia, among these Artius (to Celtic *arktos 'bear'), Nantia and Nantius (to Celtic *nant- 'fight'), Cambavius (to Celtic *kambo- 'bent'), Vecius (probably Celtic, from PIE *weik- 'fight'), Cilurnius (to Celtic *kelfurn- 'cauldron'), Mebdius, Coralius (to PIE *koro- 'army'), Melgaecus (to PIE *hmelg- 'milk'), Loveius, Durbidia, Lagius, Laucius, Aidius (to Celtic *aidu- 'fire'), Balcaius; and the composites Verotius, Vesuclotus, Cadroiolo, Veroblius, among other composite and derivative names.

Very characteristic of the peoples of the Castro culture (Gallaecians and western Astures) is their onomastic formula. Whilst the onomastic formula among the Celtiberians usually is composed by a first name followed by a patronymic expressed as a genitive, and sometimes a reference to the gens, the Castro people complete name was composed as this:

First Name + Patronymic (genitive) + [optional reference to the populi or nation (nominative)] + 'castello' or its short form '>' + origin of the person = name of the castro (ablative)

So, a name such as Caeleo Cadroiolonis F Cilenvs > Berisamo would stand for Cailios son of Cadroyolo, a Cilenian, from the hill-fort named Berisamos. Other similar anthroponymical patterns are known referring mostly to persons born in the regions in-between the rivers Navia in Asturias and Douro in Portugal, the ancient Gallaecia, among them:

- Nicer Clvtosi > Cariaca Principis Albionum: Nicer son of Clutosius, from (the hill-fort known as) Cariaca, prince of the Albions.
- Apana Ambolli F Celtica Supertam(arica)> [---]obri: Apana daughter of Ambollus, a Super-Tamaric Celtic, from (the hill-fort known as) [-]obri.
- Anceitvs Vacci F Limicvs > Talabric(a): Ancetos son of Vaccios, a Limic, from (the hill-fort known as) Talabriga.
- Bassvs Medami F Grovvs > Verio: Bassos son of Medamos, a Grovian, from (the hill-fort known as) Verio.
- Ladronu[s] Dovai Bra[ca]rus Castell[o] Durbede: Ladronos son of Dovaios, a Bracaran, from the castle Durbede.

=== Religion ===
Religious objects
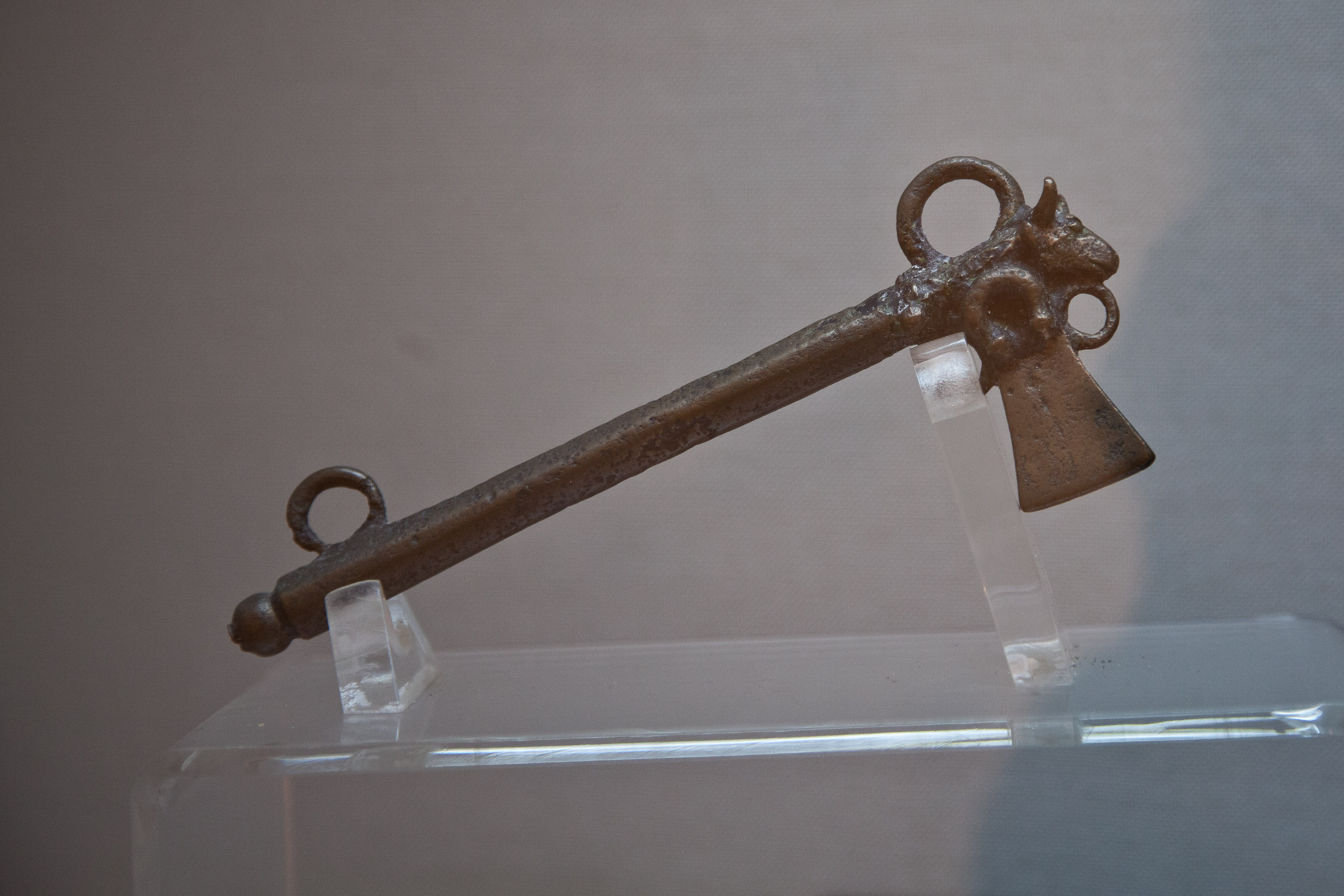
A votive sacrificial axe, ornate with torcs. From Cariño (Galicia).

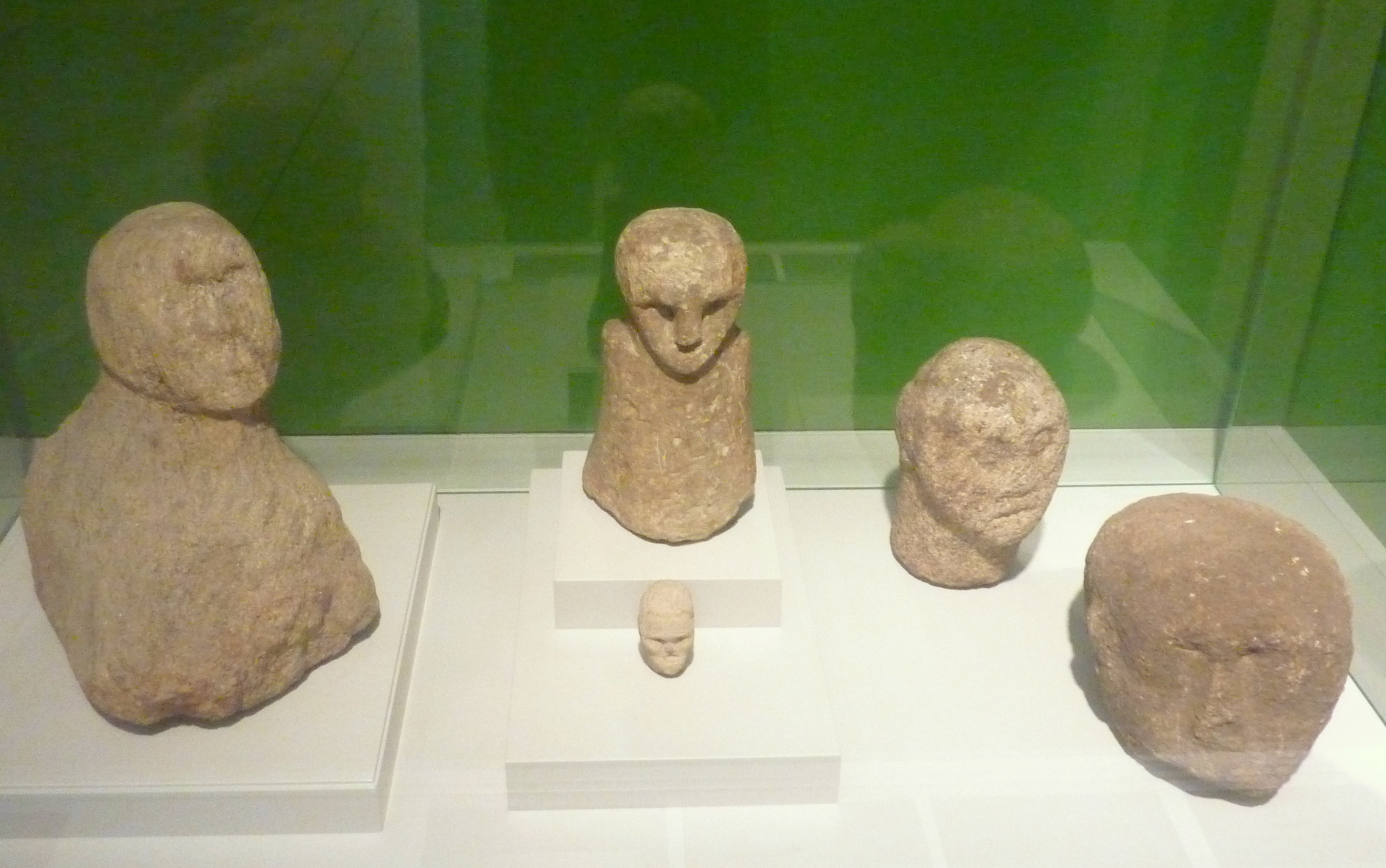
Head sculptures, Museo de Pontevedra, Galicia

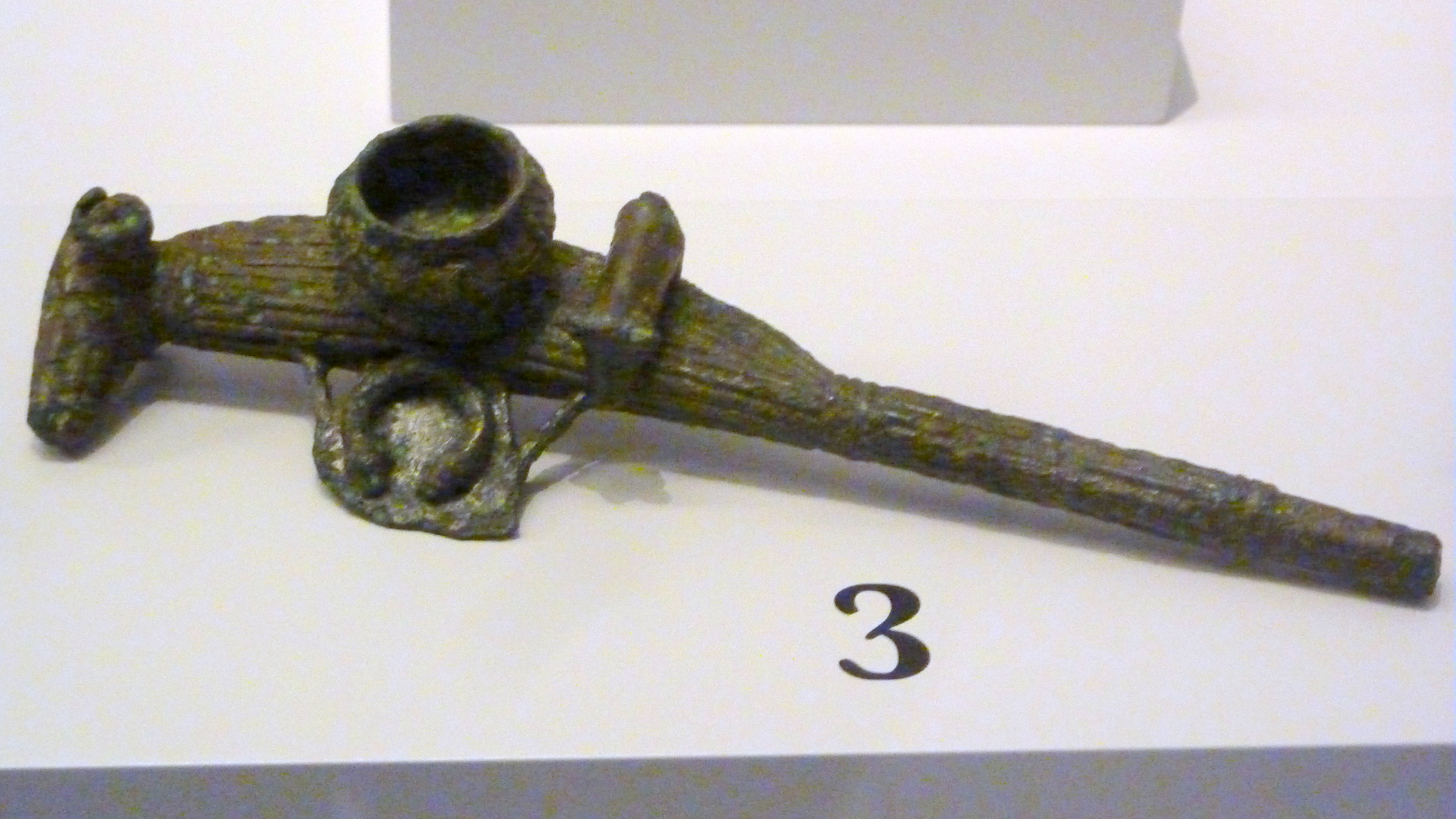
Votive sacrificial bronze, with a cauldron and a torc, Museo de Pontevedra (Galicia)

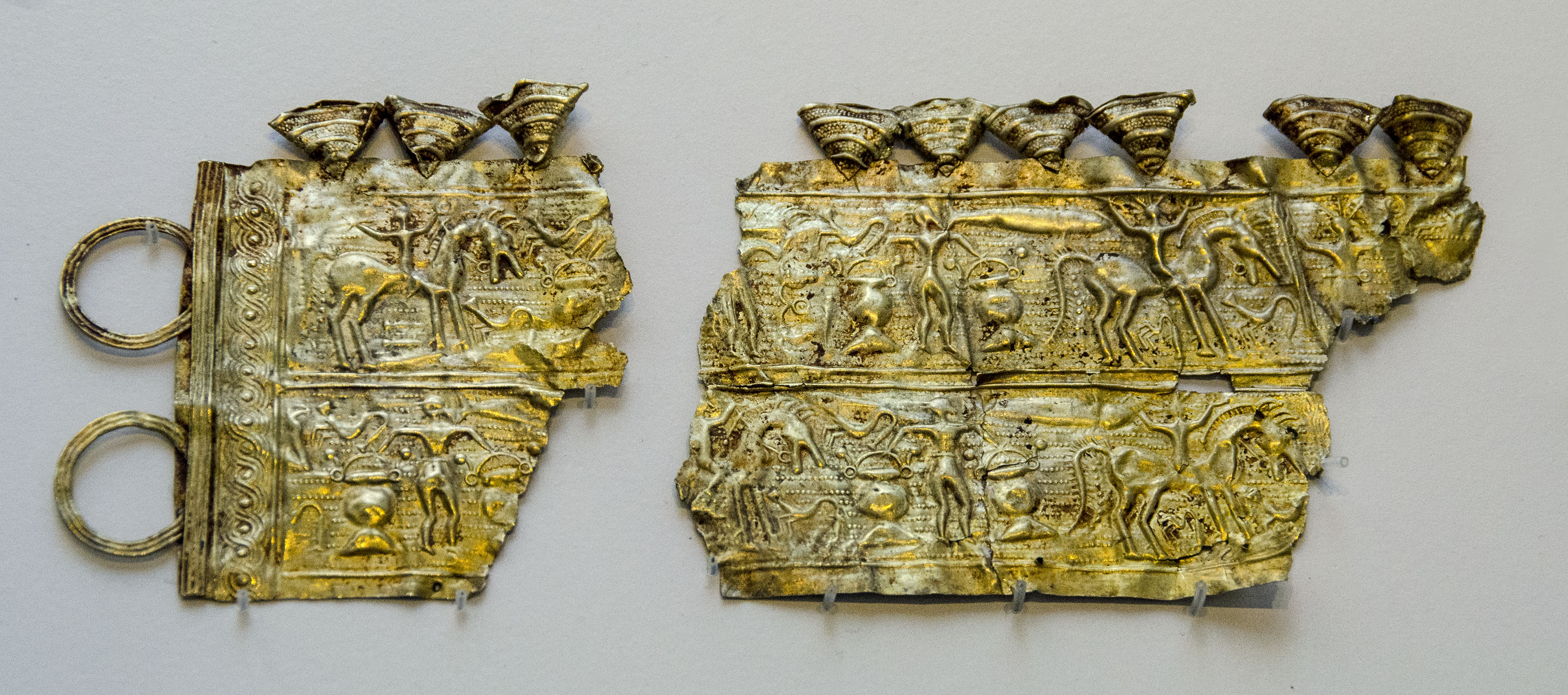
Diadem from Moñes (Piloña, Asturias). Warriors with horned helmets parade carrying torcs and cauldrons.

The religious pantheon was extensive, and included local and pan-Celtic gods.

More numerous, by a large margin, are the votive inscriptions dedicated to the autochthonous Cosus, Bandua, Nabia, and Reue. Hundreds of Latin inscriptions have survived with dedications to gods and goddesses. Archaeological finds such as ceremonial axes decorated with animal sacrificial scenes, together with the severed head sculptures and the testimonies of classical authors, confirms the ceremonial sacrifice of animals, and probably including human sacrifice as well, as among Gauls and Lusitanians.

Among the later ones the most relevant was Lugus; 5 inscriptions are known with dedication to this deity, whose name is frequently expressed as a plural dative (LUGUBO, LUCOUBU). The votive altars containing this dedications frequently present three holes for gifts or sacrifices. Other pan-European deities include Bormanicus (a god related to hot springs), the Matres, and Sulis or Suleviae (SULEIS NANTUGAICIS).

The largest number of indigenous deities found in the whole Iberian Peninsula are located in the Galician and Lusitanian regions and models proposing a fragmented and disorganized pantheon have been discarded, since the number of deities occurring together is similar to other Celtic peoples in Europe and ancient civilizations.

Cosus, a male deity, was worshipped in the coastal areas where the Celtici dwelt, from the region around Aveiro, Porto and to Northern Galicia, but seldom inland, with the exception of the El Bierzo region in Leon, where this cult has been attributed to the known arrival of Galician miners, most notably from among the Celtici Supertamarici. This deity has not been recorded in the same areas as Bandua, Reue and Nabia deities occur, and El Bierzo follows the same pattern as in the coast. From a theonymical point of view, this suggest some ethno-cultural differences between the coast and inland areas. With the exception of the Grovii people, Pomponius Mela stated that all the populi were Celtic and Cosus was not worshipped there. Pliny also rejected that the Grovii were Celtic, he considered them to have a Greek origin.

Bandua is closely associated with Roman Mars and less frequently worshipped by women. The religious nature of Cosus had many similarities with that of Bandua. Bandua had a warlike character and a defender of local communities. The worship of these two gods do not overlap but rather complement each other, occupying practically the whole of the western territory of the Iberian Peninsula. Supporting the idea, no evidence has been found of any women worshipping at any of the monuments dedicated to Cosus. Cosus sites are found near settlements, such as in Sanfins and the settlement near A Coruña, Galicia.

Nabia had double invocation, one male and one female. The supreme Nabia is related to Jupiter and another incarnation of the deity, identified with Diana, Juno or Victoria or others from the Roman pantheon, linked to the protection and defence of the community or health, wealth and fertility. Bandua, Reue, Arentius-Arentia, Quangeius, Munidis, Trebaruna, Laneana, and Nabia worshipped in the heart of Lusitania vanishes almost completely outside the boundary with the Vettones.

Bandua, Reue and Nabia were worshipped in the core area of Lusitania (including Northern Extremadura to Beira Baixa and Northern Lusitania) and reaching inland Galicia, the diffusion of these gods throughout the whole of the northern interior area shows a cultural continuity with Central Lusitania.

Funerary rites are mostly unknown except at few places, such as Cividade de Terroso, where cremation was practised.

Gods and Goddesses

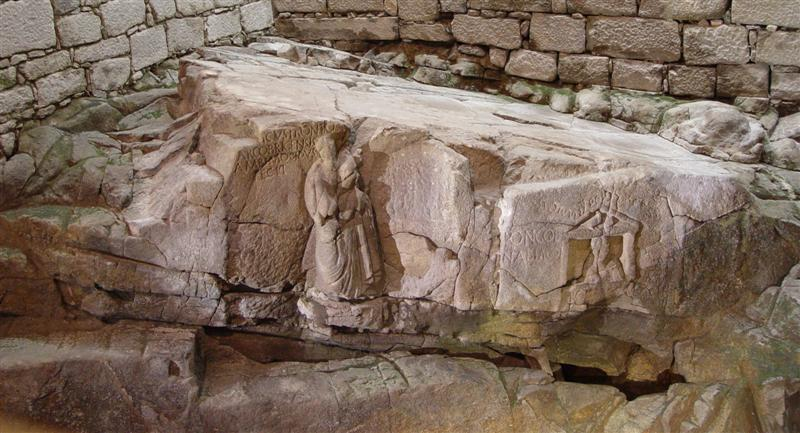
Nabia Fountain in Braga, Norte Region. The deity probably had an association with water, the sky and the earth

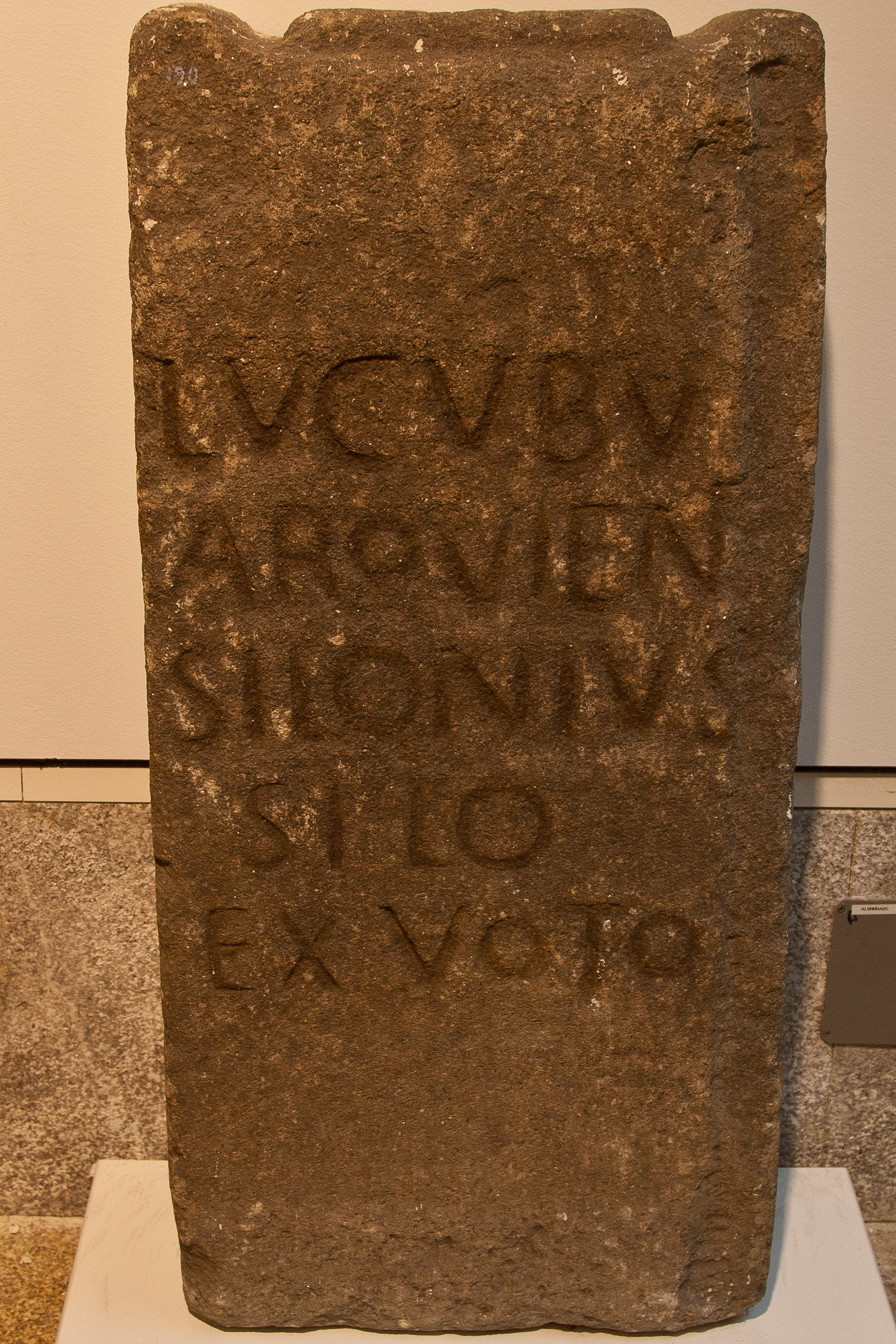
Votive inscription to Lugus: LVCVBV ARQVIEN(obu) SILONIVS SILO EX VOTO (Sinoga, Rábade, Galicia)

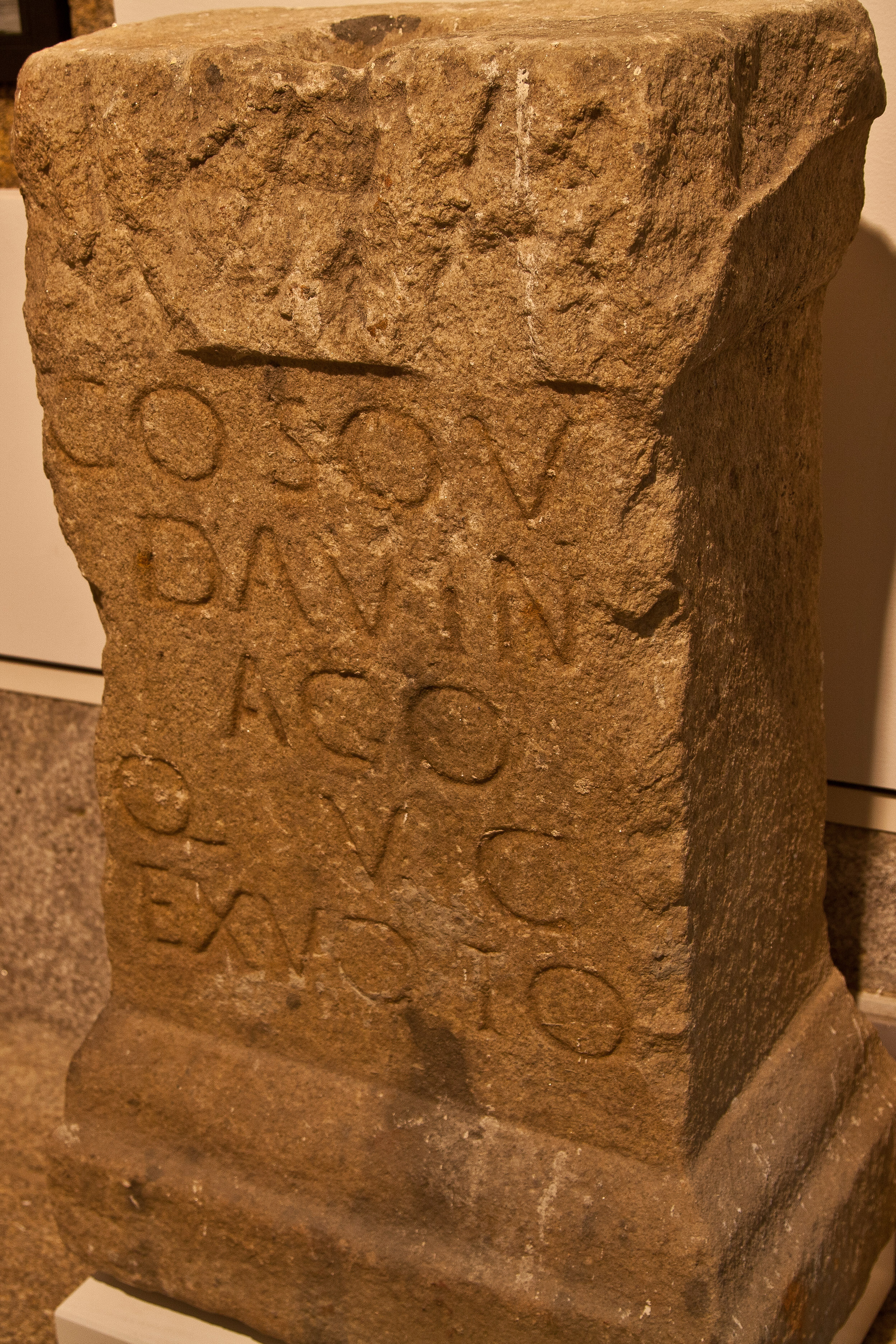
Votive inscription to Cosus: COSOV DAVINIAGO Q(uintus) V() C() EX VOTO (Sada Galicia)

== Major sites ==
World heritage candidates in 2010.

- Citânia de Briteiros, Guimarães, Northern Portugal
- Citânia de Sanfins, Paços de Ferreira, Northern Portugal
- Citânia de Santa Luzia, Viana do Castelo, Northern Portugal
- Citânia do Monte Mozinho, Penafiel, Northern Portugal
- Cividade de Terroso, Póvoa de Varzim, Northern Portugal
- Cividade de Bagunte, Vila do Conde, Northern Portugal
- Cividade de Âncora, Caminha and Viana do Castelo, Northern Portugal
- Santa Trega, A Guarda, Galicia
- San Cibrao de Las, Ourense, Galicia
- Castro de São Lourenço, Esposende, Northern Portugal
- Castro de Alvarelhos, Trofa, Northern Portugal
- Castro de Carmona, Barcelos, Northern Portugal
- Castro de Eiras, Vila Nova de Famalicão, Northern Portugal
- Castro de São Julião, Vila Verde, Northern Portugal
- Castromao, Ourense, Galicia
- Outeiro Lesenho, Boticas, Northern Portugal
- Outeiro Carvalhelhos, Boticas, Northern Portugal
- Outeiro do Pópulo, Alijó, Northern Portugal
- Outeiro de Romariz, Santa Maria da Feira, Northern Portugal
- Outeiro de Baiões, São Pedro do Sul, Northern Portugal
- Outeiro de Cárcoda, São Pedro do Sul, Northern Portugal
- Borneiro, Coruña, Galicia (Spain)
- Cabeço do Vouga, Águeda, Central Portugal
- Viladonga, Lugo, Galicia
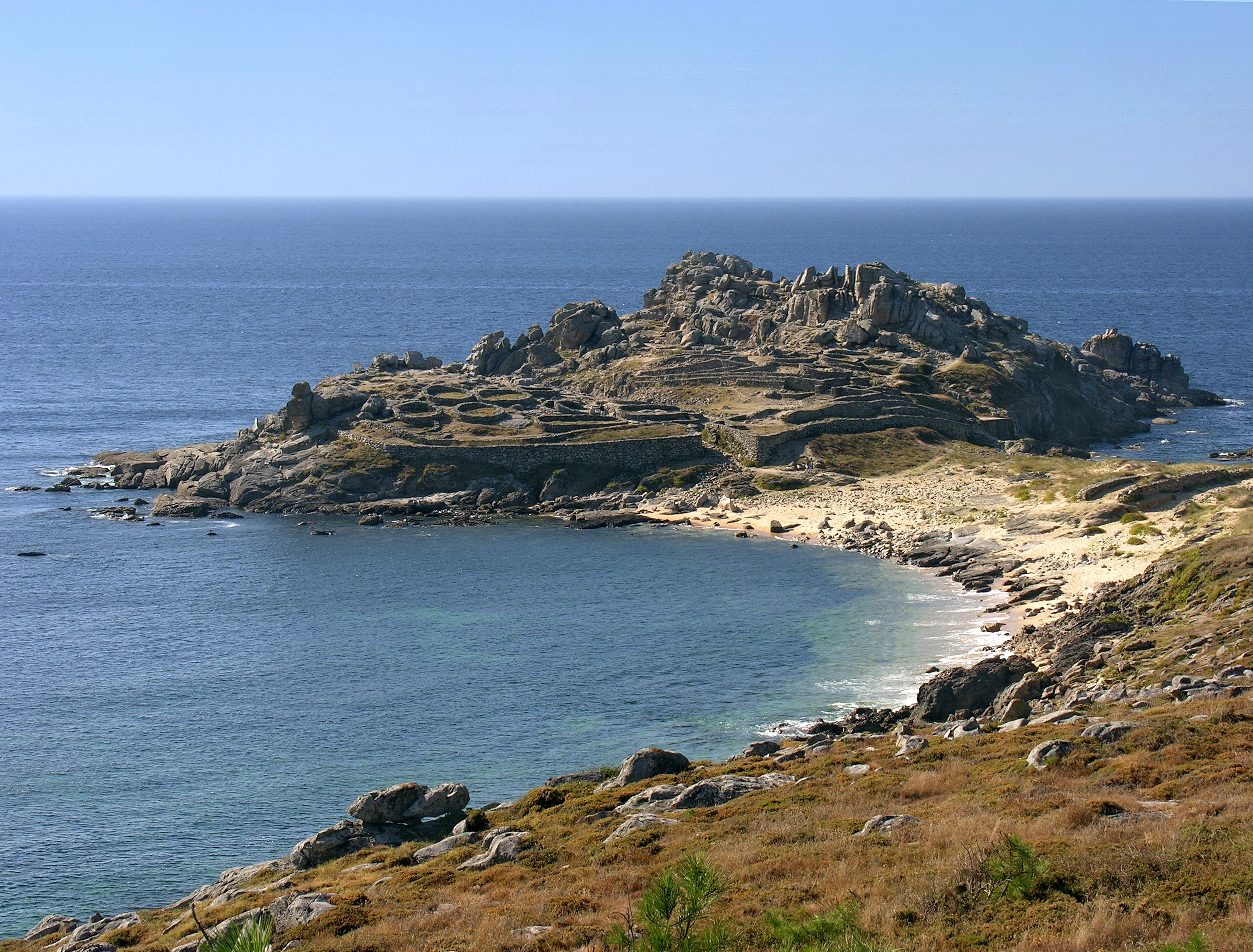
Hill fort of Baroña, Porto do Son, Galicia

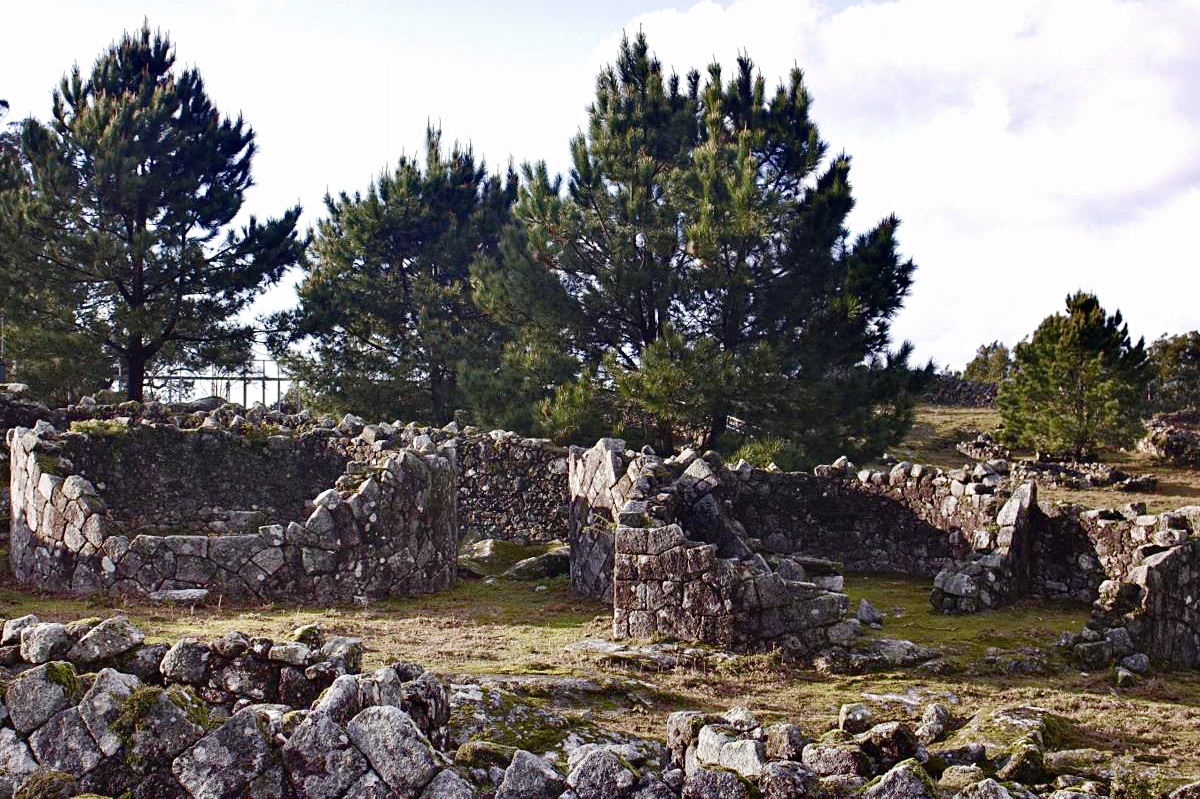
Detail of Citânia de Sta. Luzia, Areosa, Norte Region

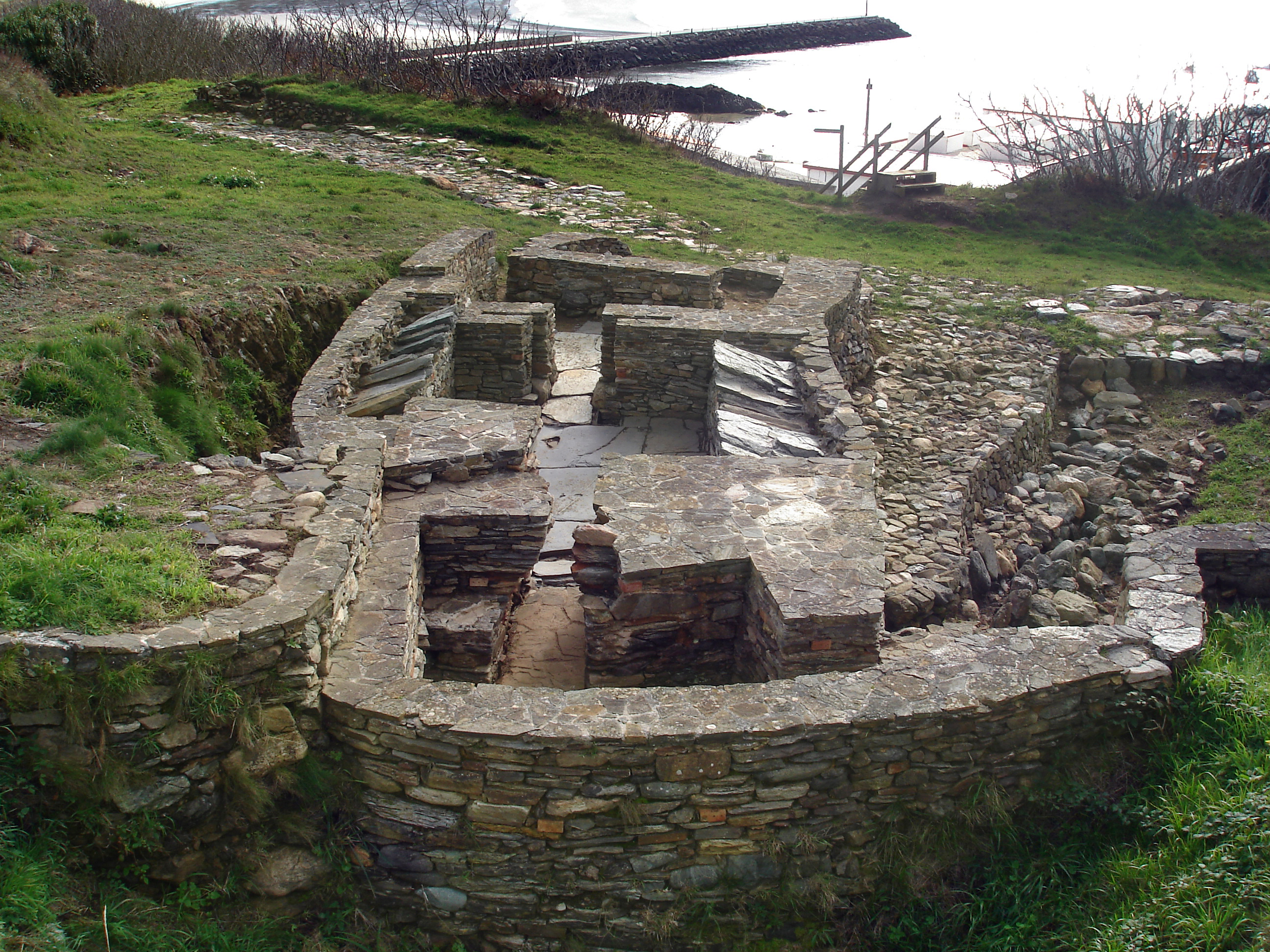
Baths or sauna at Punta dos Prados hill-fort, Ortigueira, Galicia

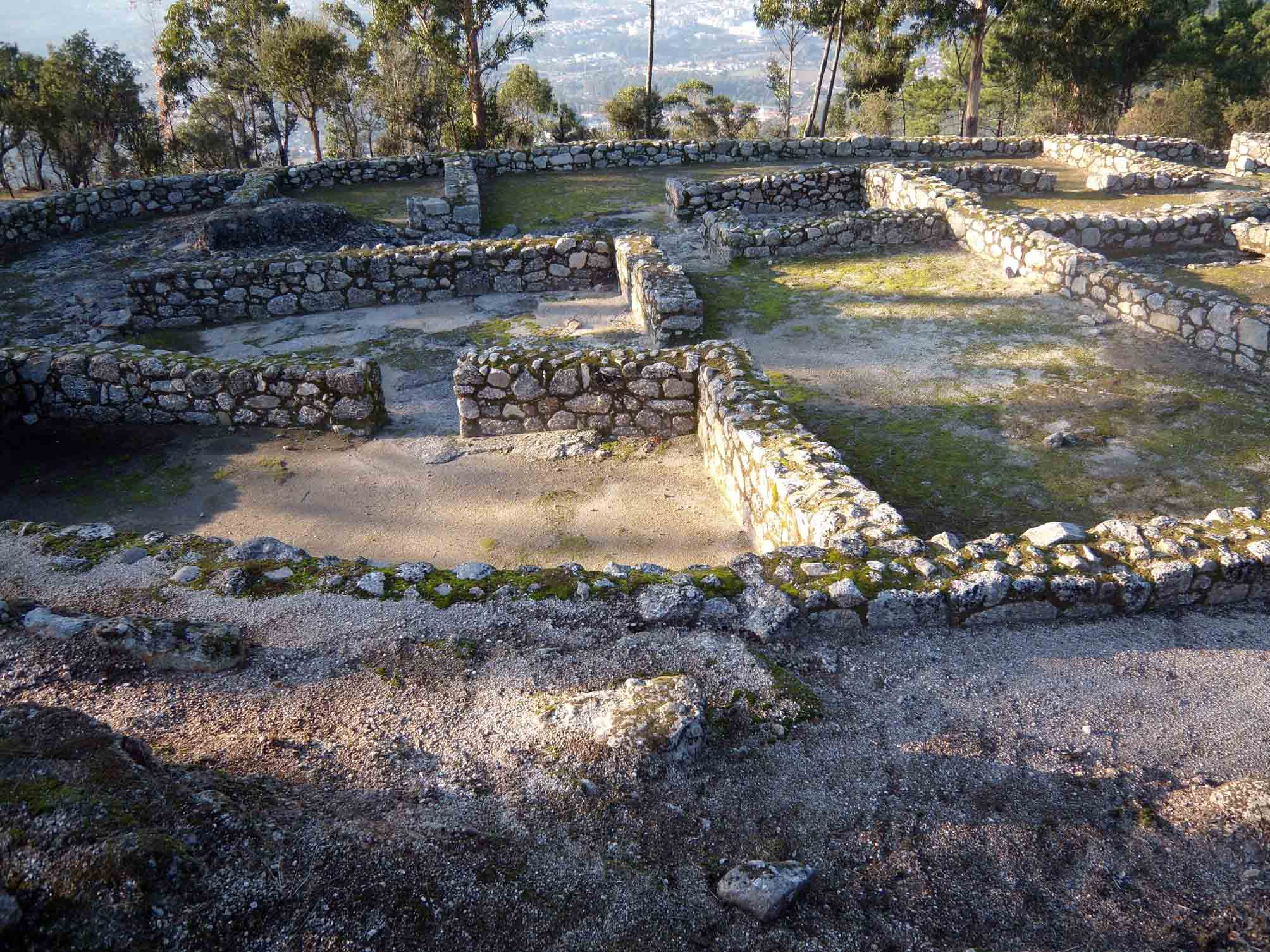
Castro do Padrão, Santo Tirso, Norte Region

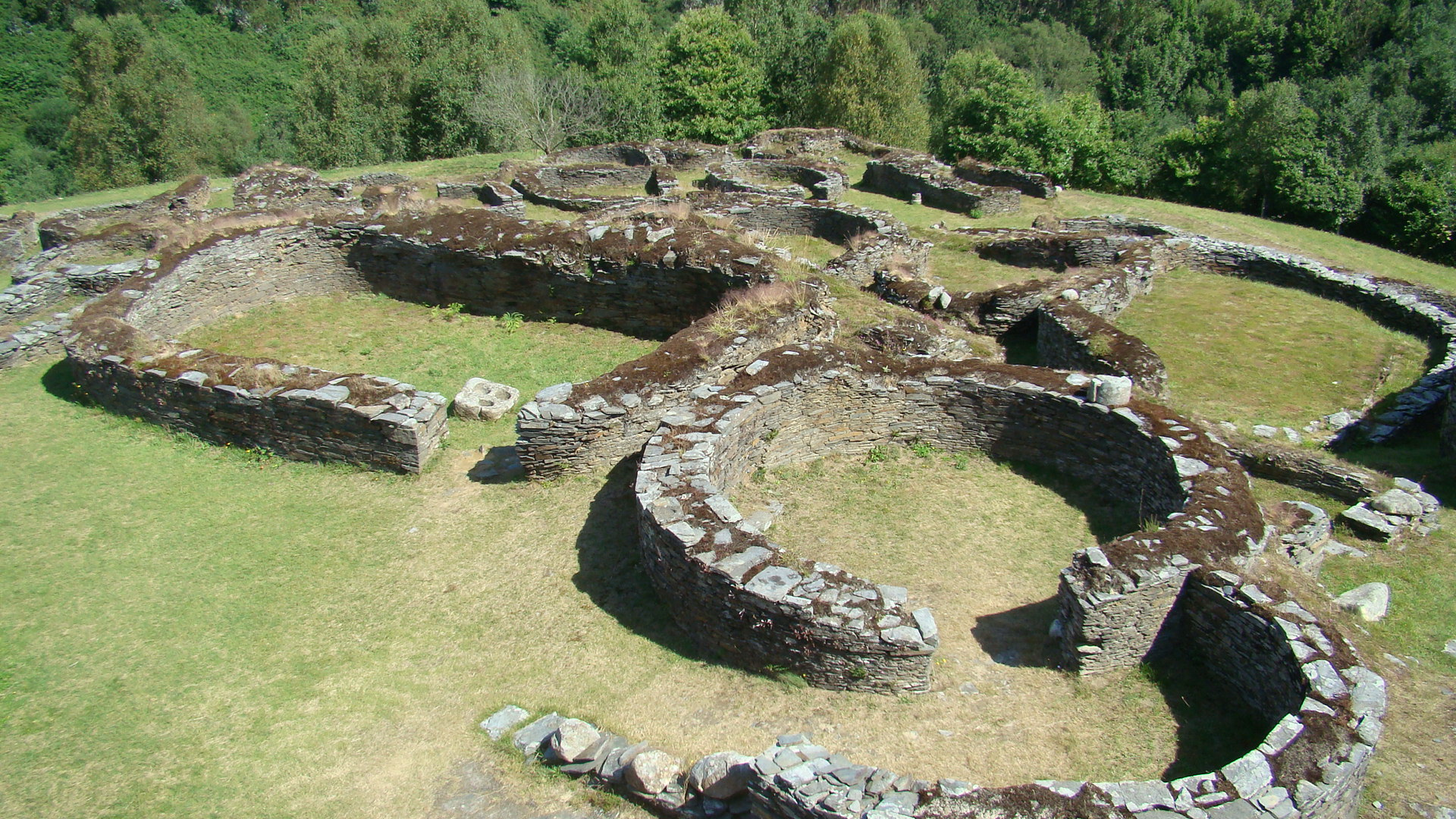
Partial view of a castro at Coaña, Asturias

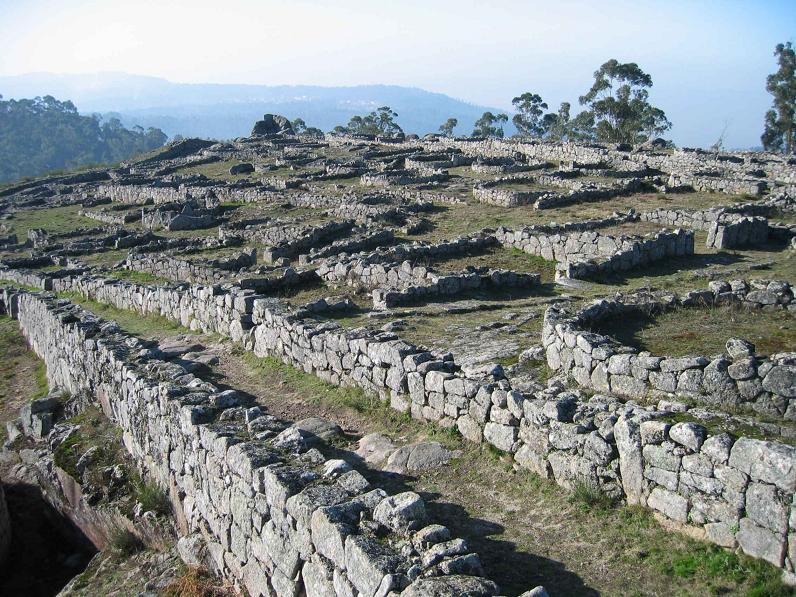
Citânia de Sanfins, Paços de Ferreira, Norte Region

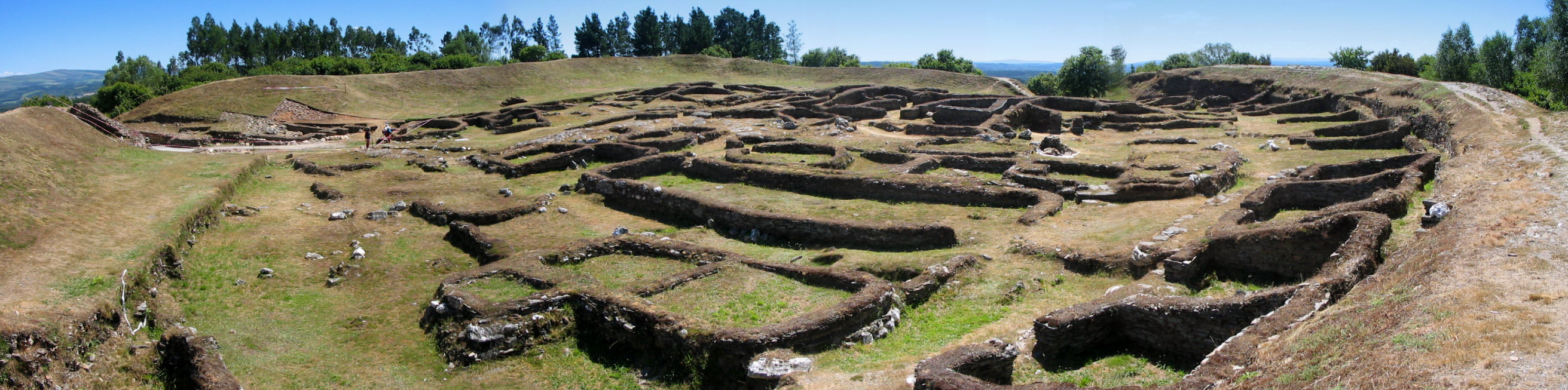
A romanized castro, at Viladonga, Castro de Rei, Galicia

Other Castros in Asturias (Spain):

Castro	Place	Dating	Comments
Arganticaeni	Piloña		
Abándames			
Almades, Les	Siero		
Alto Castro	Somiedo		
Atalaya de Tazones	Villaviciosa		
Barrera, La	Carreño		
Cabo Blanco, El	El Franco		Castro at sea
Camoca	Villaviciosa		
Canterona, La	Siero		
Caravia	Caravia		
Castelo, El	Boal		
Castelo, El	Villanueva de Oscos		
Castelón, El	Illano		
Castello	Tapia		
Castellois, Os	Illano		
Castellón, El	El Franco		Castro at sea
Castellón, El	El Franco		Castro at sea
Castiello, El	Langreo		
Castiello	Siero		Tiñana.
Castiello, El	Cangas del Narcea		
Castiello de la Marina	Villaviciosa		
Castiellu de Ambás	Villaviciosa		
Castro del Castiellu de Llagú	Oviedo		
Castiellu de Lué	Villaviciosa		
Castillos de Pereira	Tapia		
Castrillón	Castrillón		Castro at sea
Castrillón, El	Boal		
Castro, El	Taramundi		Gold
Castromior	San Martín de Oscos		
Castromourán	Vegadeo		
Castrón, El o de Arancedo	El Franco		
Castros, Los	Tapia		
Chao Sanmartín	Grandas de Salime		
Coaña	Coaña		
Cogollina, La			
Cogolla, La	Oviedo		
Corno, El	Castropol		Castro at sea
Corona, La	El Franco		
Corona, La	Ribera de Arriba		
Corona, La	Somiedo		
Corona del Castro, La	El Franco		
Corona de Costru, La	Sobrescobio		
Coronas, Las	Tapia		
Cueto, El	Ribera de Arriba		
Cueto, El	Siero		
Cuitu, El	Siero		
Curbiellu	Villaviciosa		
Cuturulo o de Valabelleiro	Grandas de Salime		
Deilán	San Martín de Oscos		
Doña Palla	Pravia		
Escrita, La	Boal		
Espinaredo	Piloña		
Esteiro, El	Tapia		
Ferreira	Santa Eulalia de Oscos		
Foncalada	Villaviciosa		
Fuentes	Villaviciosa		
Illaso	Villayón		Albion
Lagar	Boal		
Lineras	Santa Eulalia de Oscos		
Mazos, Los	Boal		
Medal	Coaña		Castro at Sea
Meredo	Vegadeo		
Miravalles	Villaviciosa		
Mohías	Coaña		
Molexón	Vegadeo		
Montouto	Vegadeo		
Morillón	Vegadeo		
Muries, Les	Siero		
Noega	Gijón		Castro at sea
Obetao	Oviedo		
Olivar	Villaviciosa		
Ouria	Boal		
Pedreres, Les	Ribera de Arriba		
Pendia	Boal		
Penzol	Vegadeo		
Peña Castiello	Castrillón		
Peña del Conchéu, La	Riosa		
Picón, El	Tapia		
Picu Castiellu	Langreo		
Pico Castiello	Oviedo		
Pico Castiello	Ribera de Arriba		
Pico Castiello	Ribera de Arriba		
Pico Castiello	Riosa		
Pico Castiello, El	Siero		
Picu Castiello, El	Siero		
Picu Cervera	Belmonte de Miranda		
Picu Castiellu de Moriyón	Villaviciosa		
Picu da Mina, El	San Martín de Oscos		
Pico El Cogollo	Oviedo		
Piñera	Navia		in Peña Piñera at 1069 m
Prahúa	Candamo		
Punta de la Figueira, La			Castro at sea
Remonguila, La	Somiedo		
Represas	Tapia de Casariego		
Riera, La	Colunga		
Salcido	San Tirso de Abres		
San Ḷḷuis	Allande		Gold
San Cruz	Pesoz		
San Isidro	Pesoz	Gold	
San Pelayo	San Martín de Oscos		
Sobia	Teverga	before 4th century BC	
Teifaros	Navia		Castro at sea.
Torre, La	Siero		
Trasdelcastro	Somiedo		
Viladaelle	Vegadeo		
Villarín del Piorno	San Martín de Oscos		

The Cariaca Castro is not identified, as only a small amount of Castros are called with his old names (like Coaña). Important Castros in the Albion Territory, near the Nicer stele and Navia and Eo Rivers are: Coaña, Chao de Samartín, Pendía and Taramundi.

== See also ==
- List of castros in Galicia
- Cantabrian stelae
- Celtic place-names in Galicia
- List of Celtic place names in Portugal
- Celts
- Gallaeci
- Galician Institute for Celtic Studies
- Gallaecian language
- Hispano-Celtic languages

== Bibliography ==
- Arias Vila, F. (1992). A Romanización de Galicia. A Nosa Terra. 1992. ISBN 84-604-3279-3.
- Armada, Xosé-Lois; García-Vuelta, Óscar. "Os atributos do guerreiro, as ofrendas da comunidade. A interpretación dos torques a través da iconografía". CÁTEDRA. Revista eumesa de estudios.
- Ayán Vila, Xurxo (2008). A Round Iron Age: The Circular House in the Hillforts of the Northwestern Iberian Peninsula . In e-Keltoi, Volume 6: 903–1003. UW System Board of Regents, 2008. ISSN 1540-4889.
- Calo Lourido, F. (1993). A Cultura Castrexa. A nosa Terra. 1993. ISBN 84-89138-71-0.
- García Quintela (2005). Celtic Elements in Northwestern Spain in Pre-Roman times . In e-Keltoi, Volume 6: 497–569. UW System Board of Regents, 2005. ISSN 1540-4889.
- González García, F. J. (ed.) (2007). Los pueblos de la Galicia céltica. AKAL. 2007. ISBN 978-84-460-2260-2.
- González Ruibal, Alfredo (2004). Artistic Expression and Material Culture in Celtic Gallaecia' . In e-Keltoi, Volume 6: 113–166. UW System Board of Regents, 2004. ISSN 1540-4889.
- Júdice Gamito, Teresa (2005). The Celts in Portugal . In e-Keltoi, Volume 6: 571–605. UW System Board of Regents, 2005. ISSN 1540-4889.
- Luján Martínez, Eugenio R. (2006) The Language(s) of the Callaeci. In e-Keltoi, Volume 6: 715–748. UW System Board of Regents, 2005. ISSN 1540-4889.
- Marco Simón, Francisco (2005). Religion and Religious Practices of the Ancient Celts of the Iberian Peninsula. In e-Keltoi, Volume 6: 287–345. UW System Board of Regents, 2005. ISSN 1540-4889.
- Olivares Pedreño, Juan Carlos (2002). Los dioses de la Hispania celtica. Madrid: Universitat de Alacant. ISBN 9788495983008.
- Parcero-Oubiña C. and Cobas-Fernández, I (2004). Iron Age Archaeology of the Northwest Iberian Peninsula. In e-Keltoi, Volume 6: 1-72. UW System Board of Regents, 2004. ISSN 1540-4889.
- Prósper, B. M. (2002) Lénguas y religiones prerromanas del occidente de la península ibérica. Universidad de Salamanca. 2002. ISBN 84-7800-818-7.
- Rodríguez-Corral, Javier (2009). A Galicia Castrexa. Lóstrego. 2009. ISBN 978-84-936613-3-5.
- Romero, Bieito (2009). Xeometrías Máxicas de Galicia. Ir Indo. 2009. ISBN 978-84-7680-639-5.
- Silva, A. J. M. (2012), Vivre au-delà du fleuve de l'Oubli. Portrait de la communauté villageoise du Castro do Vieito au moment de l'intégration du NO de la péninsule ibérique dans l'orbis Romanum (estuaire du Rio Lima, NO du Portugal) (in French), Oxford, United Kingdom: Archaeopress
