= Belém Cultural Center =

Convention center in Lisbon, Portugal

- Centro Cultural de Belém
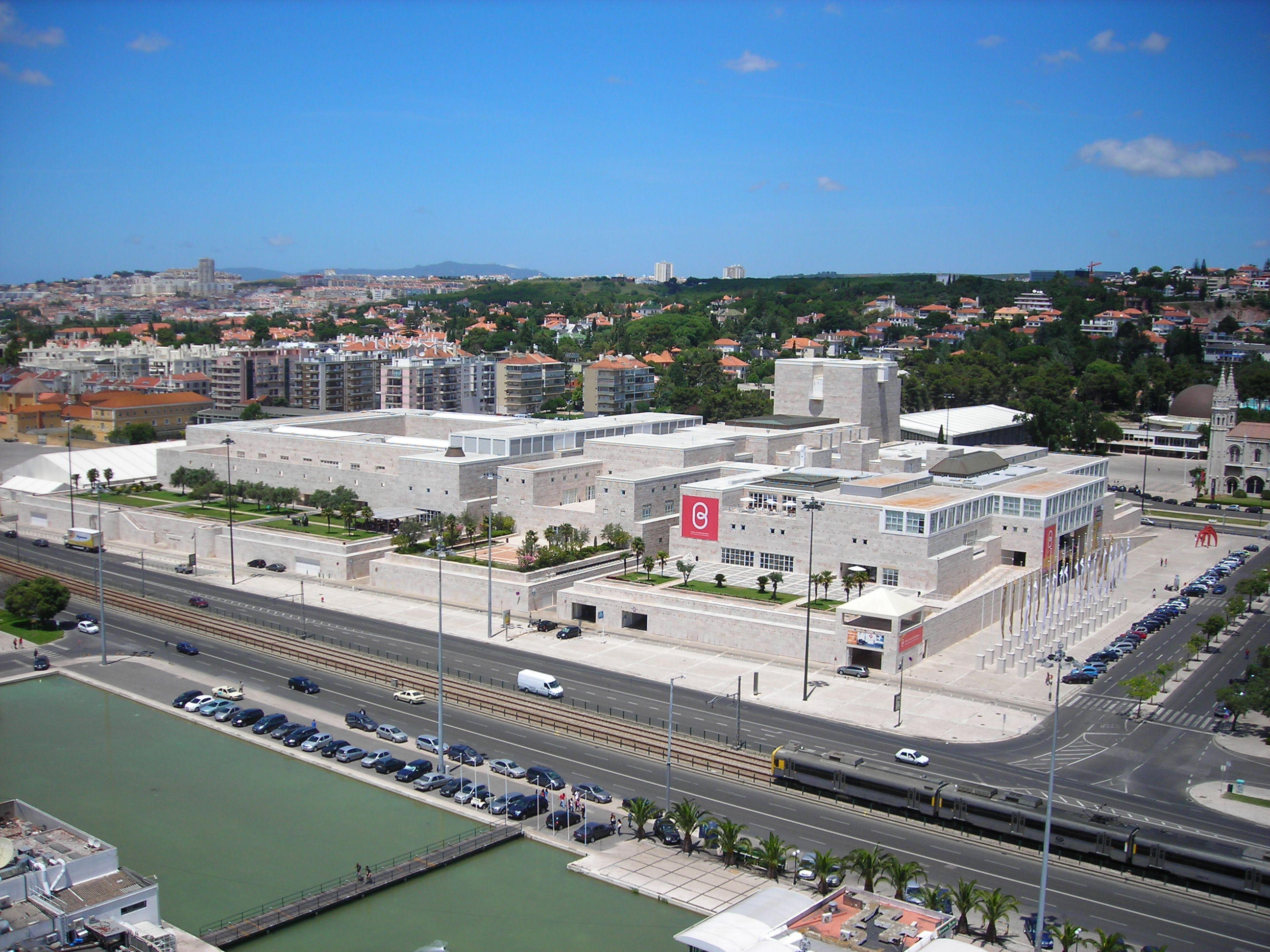
- Belém Cultural Centre seen from the Padrão dos Descobrimentos

- Location within Lisbon
- Interactive fullscreen map

General information
- Type: Cultural centre, Concert hall, Convention centre
- Architectural style: Modern
- Location: Belém, Lisbon, Portugal
- Coordinates: 38°41′43″N 9°12′31″W
- Groundbreaking: 1989
- Opened: January 1992
- Owner: Fundação Centro Cultural de Belém

Technical details
- Material: Concrete, lioz

Design and construction
- Architect: Vittorio Gregotti with Manuel Salgado

Website
- ccb.pt

The Belém Cultural Center (Portuguese: Centro Cultural de Belém) is a complex of artistic venues located in Belém in the city of Lisbon, Portugal. It is the largest building with cultural facilities in Portugal, with over 140,000 m^{2} (1,500,000 sq ft) of usable space. The centre was initially built to accommodate the programme of Portugal's Presidency of the European Council in 1992, but with the long-term goal of providing permanent venues for conferences, exhibitions and performance arts (such as opera, ballet and concerts), in addition to meeting halls, shops and cafés.

== History ==
The decision to build the cultural center was taken in January 1988, as part of the Portuguese government's understanding that it needed building to host the works of Portugal's European Union Presidency (in 1992). The building would also serve as a core facility for cultural and leisure activities after its term, and as a venue for conferences and exhibitions.

An international architectural competition was held and six proposals were invited to submit a preliminary project, out of the 57 submissions. The final proposal, submitted by the architectural consortium of Vittorio Gregotti (Italy) and Atelier Risco at the time led by Manuel Salgado (Portugal), was designed to include five modules: a Conference Centre, a Performing Arts Centre, an Exhibition Centre, a Hotel and complementary equipment zone, but the Conference Centre, the Performing Arts Centre and the Exhibition Centre were initially built.

Starting in July 1989, the pre-existing buildings along the waterfront were demolished and many of the infrastructures were reestablished. By January 1992, modules 1, 2 and 3 were completed and ready to accommodate the institutions, administration, communication centre and security of the European Union Presidency. A year later the Conference Centre and small auditorium (March) and later the Exhibition Centre were opened to the public. By September of the same year, the main auditorium was opened.

=== Events ===
It has hosted events like the summit meeting of the heads of state of the Organization for Security and Co-operation in Europe (OSCE).

== Architecture ==
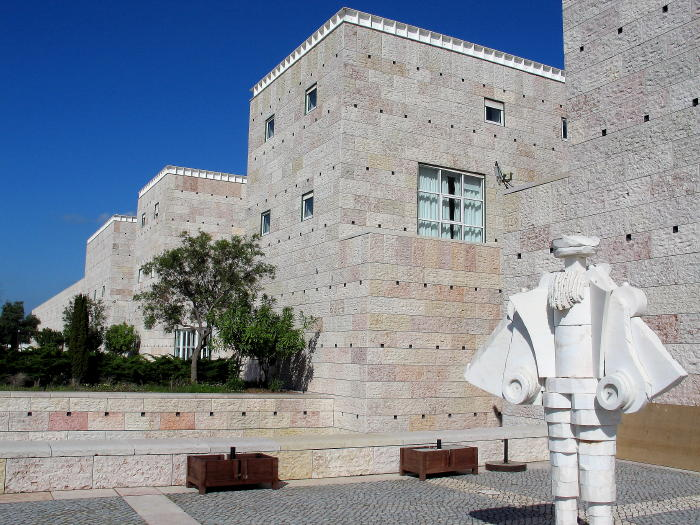
A sculpture near one of the patios/entrance ways to the cultural centre

The building is located in the parish of Belém, near the riverfront west of Lisbon, between the dual Avenida da Índia-Avenida de Brasília motorway and Rua Bartolomeu Dias. Apart from fronting the Praça do Império (Imperial Square), it juxtapositions the Jerónimos Monastery, and is surrounded by many historical buildings, such as the Palace and Tower of Belém, National Museum of Archaeology, Planetarium, and Monument to the Discoveries.

The Belém Cultural Centre has 140,000 m^{2} of construction area and was prepared in a very short period (1989–1992). The client of the project was the Portuguese State through the secretary of state for culture. Completed in 1992, it occupies a total of 100,000 m^{2} and is the work of architects Vittorio Gregotti and Manuel Salgado; the interior design was planned by Daciano Costa.

The centre's position, aligned with the Jerónimos Monastery, intentionally fronts the Império Square, and consists of structural blocks with courtyards and "patio-squares" that interconnect the three principal structures. Each centre is separated by transversal "streets", that link the building's interiors which are extensions of the city of Lisbon's historical urban structure. The centrality of the main building extends the urban fabric to the interior creating a public space. This architectural style can best be interpreted by Santana and Matos (2010) who refer to as the "patios-squares" versus the "narrow streets" a conflicting dynamic structure.

The Belém Cultural Centre won the International Stone Architecture Award at the Verona Fair in 1993.

=== Facilities ===
The centre features several areas with different roles:

- The Conference Centre provides a close link with the most varied business and professional sectors; conceived in order to support conferences and meetings, as well as the cultural center's operational services, stores, a restaurant, two bars, parking areas and the Jacques Delors European Information Centre;
- The Performing Arts Centre, the core of the site's cultural and artistic activities, includes two auditoriums (the larger holding 1,429 seats and the smaller with 348 seats), a rehearsal hall with 72 seats, in order to support film, opera, ballet, theatre and music events;
- The Exhibition Centre, which includes four galleries for art exhibitions, architecture, design and photography, in addition to cafés and shops, worked as the Museum of Design from 1999 to 2006, as the Museu Coleção Berardo from 2007 to 2022, and is now the venue of the MAC/CCB - Museum of Contemporary Art and Architecture Centre since October 2023.

The centre also provides additional services:

- The Educational Service provides a close link between the Foundation and schools of various levels as well as other institutions; and
- The Training Service is a service of the Belém Cultural Centre Foundation; courses, seminars and Conferences are directed towards teaching and learning, as well as the acquisition of further knowledge, skills and specialisation in the different areas of the arts, and culture.

== Gallery ==
View from the north-northeast

East façade viewed from the east-southeast

Public square with Portuguese paving

Vertical gardens flanking the museum entrance

Pedestrian passage between the stone-clad buildings

Jardim das Oliveiras, with olive trees and a water channel

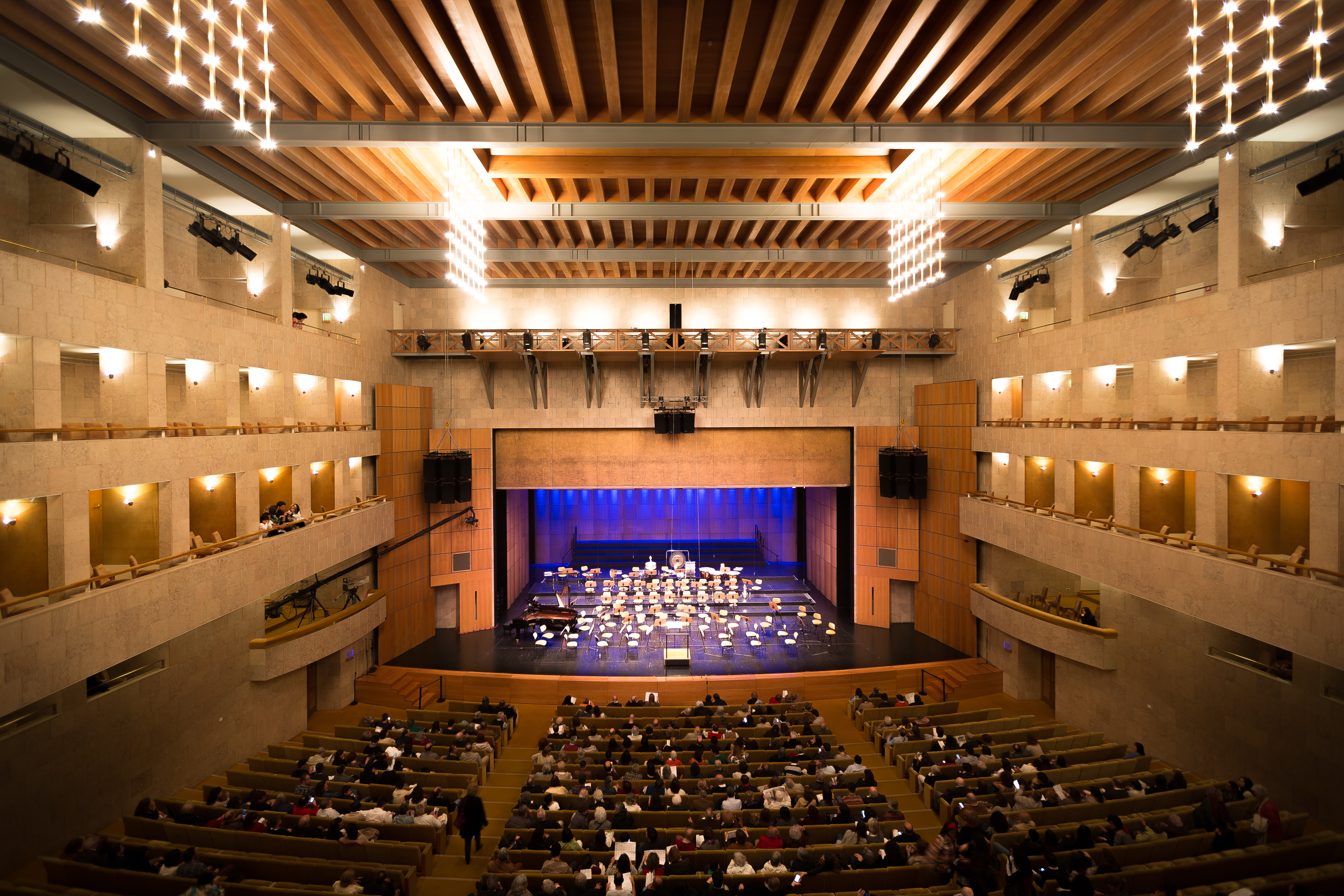
Grand Auditorium during a concert in 2015

== See also ==
- List of concert halls
- List of theatres and auditoriums in Lisbon
