= Empire Plaza =

Empire Plaza may refer to:

- Empire State Plaza, a complex of state government buildings in Albany, New York, United States
- Empire Square, a city square in Lisbon, Portugal
