= National Museum of Archaeology, Lisbon =

Building in Lisbon, Lisbon District, Portugal

National Museum of Archaeology, of Doctor Leite de Vasconcelos
- Museu Nacional de Arqueologia, do Doutor Leite de Vasconcelos
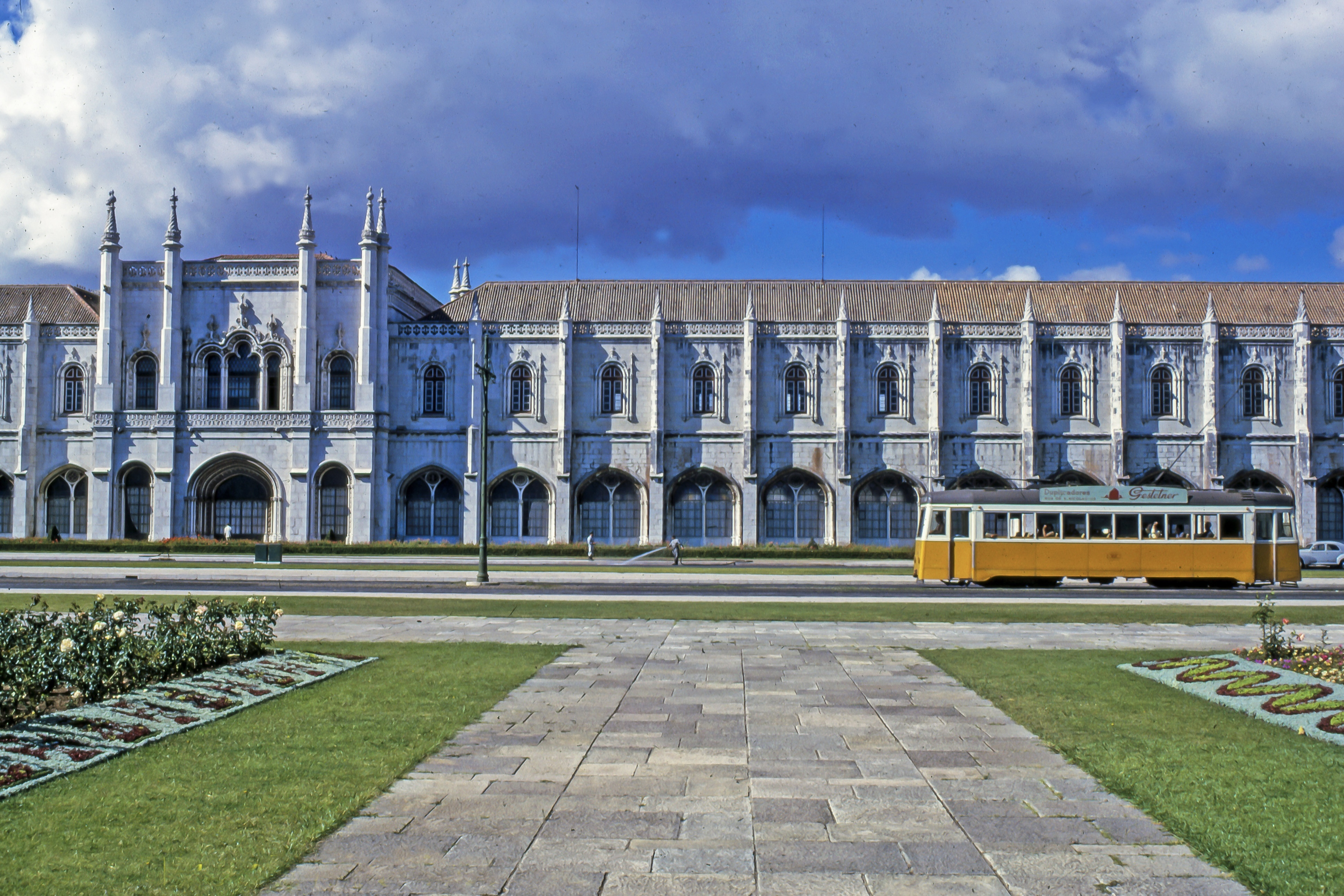
- Main facade
- Established: December 20, 1893; 132 years ago
- Location: Praça do Império, Belém, Lisbon, Portugal
- Coordinates: 38°41′50″N 9°12′25″W
- Type: Archaeology museum
- Visitors: 263,650 (2019)
- Founder: José Leite de Vasconcelos
- Website: Museu Nacional de Arqueologia

The National Museum of Archaeology, of Doctor Leite de Vasconcelos (Note: Portuguese: Museu Nacional de Arqueologia, do Doutor Leite de Vasconcelos) is the largest archaeological museum in Portugal and one of the most important museums devoted to ancient art found in the Iberian Peninsula. Located in Lisbon, the museum was founded in 1893 by the archaeologist José Leite de Vasconcelos. The museum is located in the western wing of the Jeronimos Monastery where the monks had their dormitory. The museum is built in the Neo-Manueline style and was officially opened in 1906.

The museum is the result of José Leite de Vasconcelos's efforts to create an archaeological museum dedicated to the history of Portuguese people. With the support of the politician Bernardino Machado, a legal decree for the creation of a National Ethnographic Museum was established on 20 December 1893. The museum is the most important centre for archaeological research in Portugal. The museum has received the international Genio Protector da Colonia Augusta Emerita prize, awarded by the Foundation for Roman Studies and the Friends of the National Museum of Roman Art in Mérida, Spain.

== Collection ==
The museum's archive consists of Leite de Vasocnelos's initial collection and others: either donated to the state, incorporated from other museums or the result of the extensive archaeological explorations carried out by the museum and its staff. The museum's archive boasts items from over 3,200 archaeological sites and covers over 500,000 years of the Iberian Peninsula's history. It has the biggest collection of Roman mosaics in Portugal and an important collection of Portuguese and African ethnography. The museum's archive is available for consultation via MatrizNet.

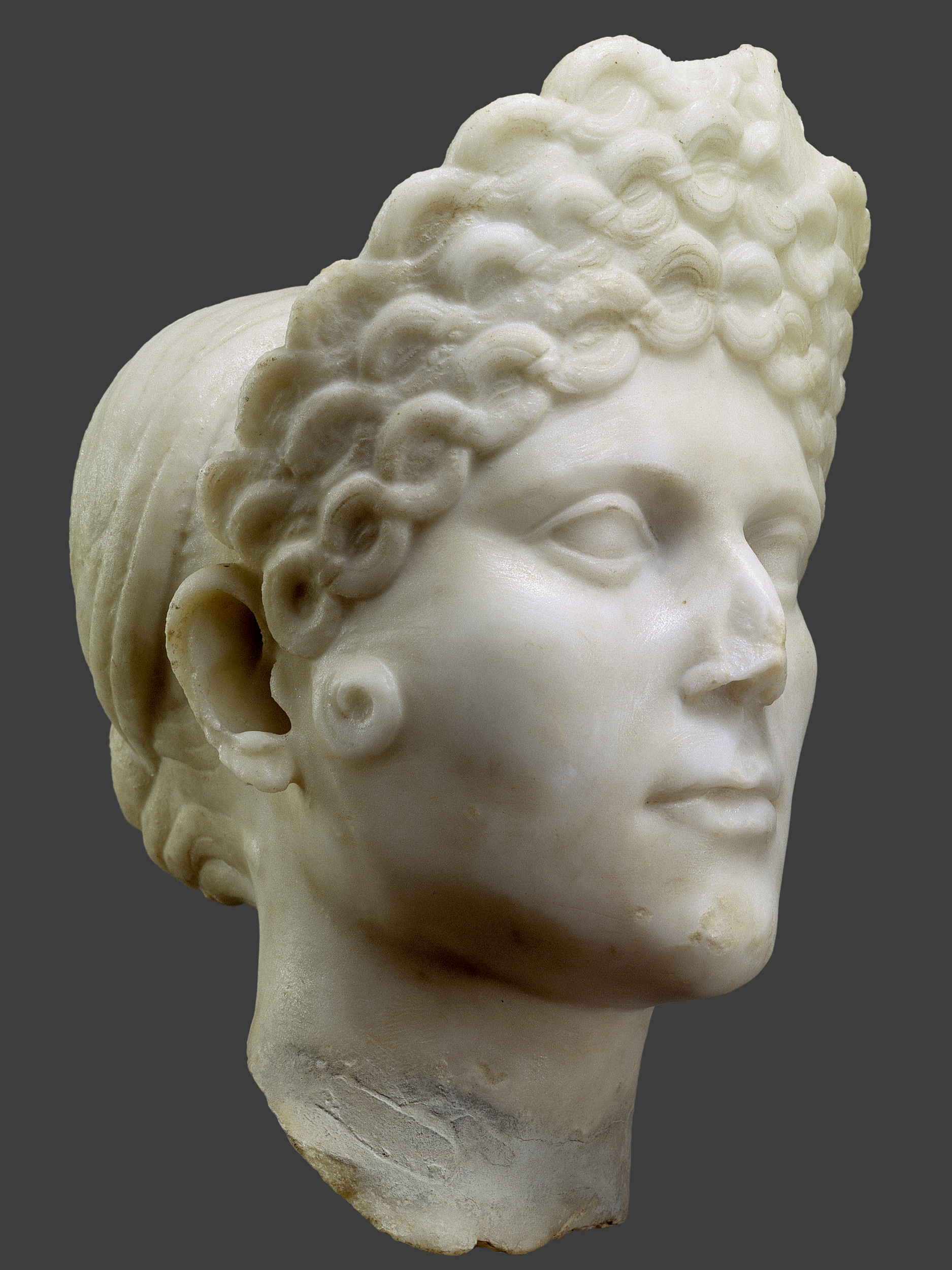
Female bust (Julia Flavia), 1st–2nd centuries AD, Roman period

=== Main collection ===
The main nucleus of the collection consists of ancient jewelry kept in the Treasures exhibition room, it is one of the most important collections of its kind in the Iberian Peninsula.

Of equal importance are the museum's collections of epigraphy, of which the collection from the Sanctuary of S. Miguel da Mota (from the Endovelicus period) is of particular importance, as are its Roman mosaics, a few of which are National Treasures of Portugal.

=== Metal artifacts ===
The museum's metalwork collection is representative of the mineral and metallurgical history of the Iberian Peninsula, which includes tools created in copper from the Chalcolithic period (middle of the 3rd century BC). Also in its collection are the oldest iron tools found in Portugal found in tombs located in the Alentejo region dating to the first Iron Age (7th–6th century BC). Of particular importance are a group of artefacts named the "Atlantic bronzes" and farming tools from the Roman Period.

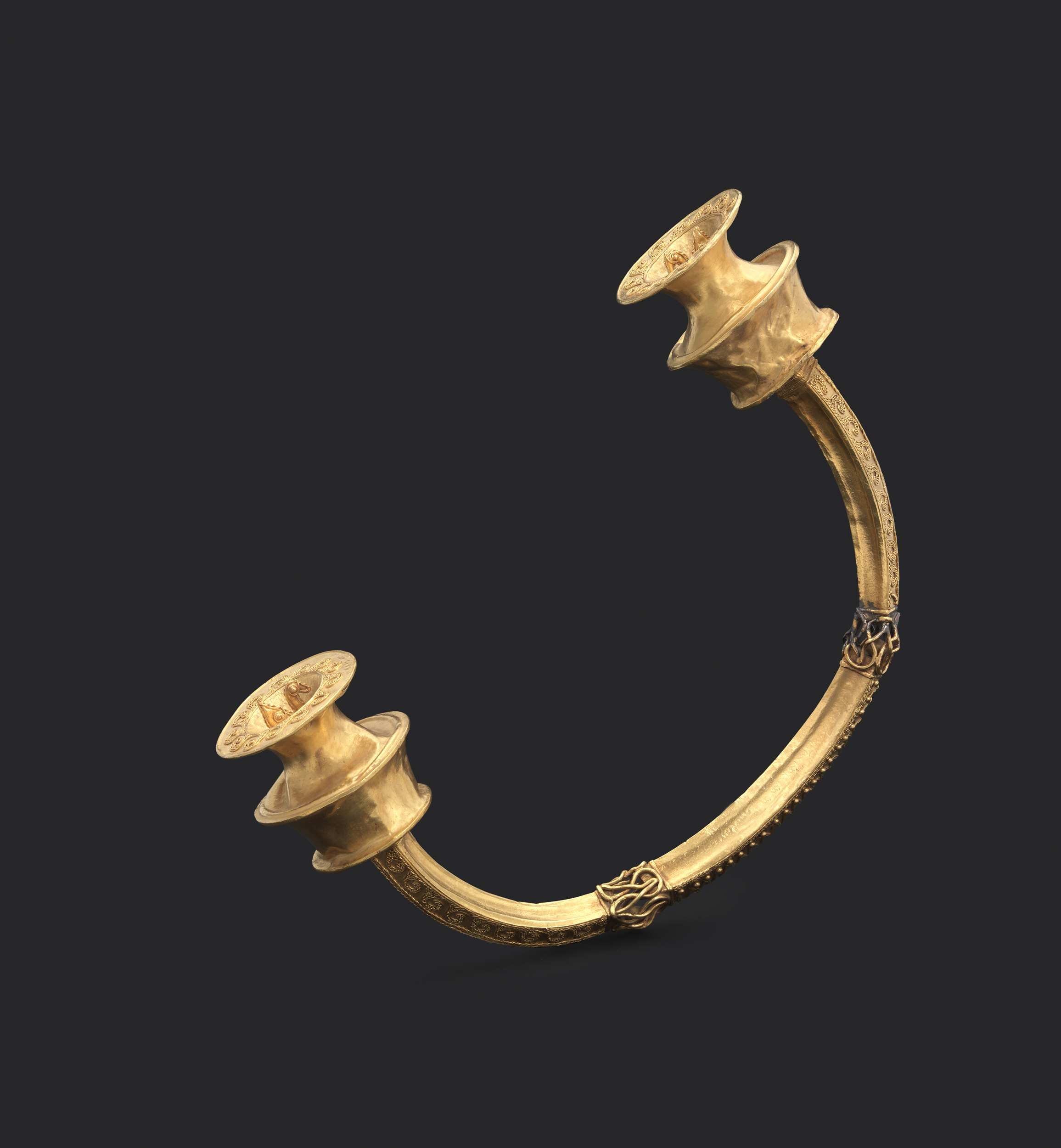
Torc, Second Iron Age, Castro Culture, northeastern Iberian Peninsula

=== Sculpture ===
The museum also has the largest collection of Classical sculpture in Portugal. From this period, items of particular technical and stylistic value are the toga-draped statues from Mertola, Apollo from the Herdade do Álamo (Alcoutim) and the sarcophagi from Tróia and Castanheira do Ribatejo. Of note is the collection found in the Sanctuary of S. Miguel da Mota, which is the largest collection of its kind sculpted in Vila Viçosa / Estremoz type marble. The latter collection was found extensively vandalised; this is presumed to be the result of iconoclasm carried out by early Christian communities.

Emblematic of the Celtic period in North-eastern Portugal are the monumental granite statues representing princes or noblepeople, often referred to as the "Gallecian Warriors" which guard the museum's entrance. The museum has the largest and most significant collection of Gallecian sculpture in the Iberian Peninsula. Also in this collection are the "Verraco" zoomorphic sculptures, probably created for totemic purposes.

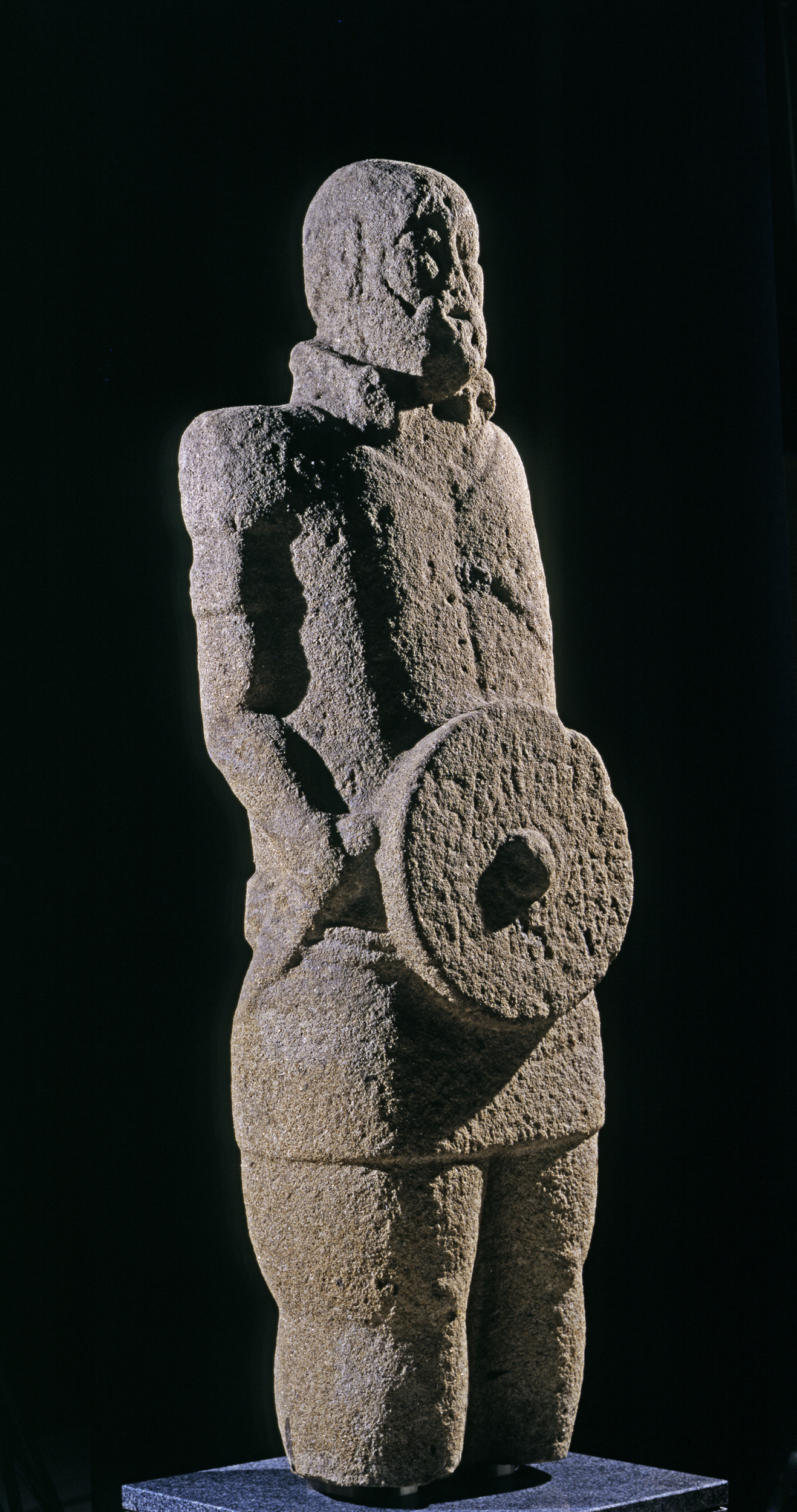
A statue of a Gallaecian warrior, two of which mark the entrance to the museum, Castro Culture, 1st century AD

=== Roman mosaics ===
Even though many Roman mosaics have been found in Portugal, this collection cannot be considered of international importance, especially when compared to collections in neighbouring Spain and Northern Africa. Nevertheless, within this collection, the most important items are mosaics from the Roman Villas of Torre da Palma, Santa Vitória do Ameixal, Milreu and Montinho das Laranjeiras. The most common themes found in these mosaics come from classical mythology: the journey of Odysseus, Orpheus and the labours of Hercules. Almost all the mosaics date to the 3rd century BC.

=== Gold jewelry ===
The museum's collection, built over more than half a century, has over 1,000 items of gold jewellery dating from pre-history to ancient history. The collection, which had been kept from the public, is now available for all to see, and displayed chrono-culturally. Some of the most important items found in this collection are the treasures of the Herdade do Álamo and Baião, the Arrecadas from Paços de Ferreira and the notable torc of Vilas-Boas.

=== Epigraphy ===
José Leite de Vasconcelos was a noted epigraphist, and the museum boasts one of the best national collections of epigraphy. Characterised by three motives, funerary, votive and honorific, the vast majority of the collection is of Latin epigraphy and tombstones. The museum also holds a collection of important early Christian epigraphy.

Templates obeying predefined formula were often used for Roman Imperial Latin epigraphy. Inscriptions such as D.M.S. (dis manibus sacrum), H.S.E. (hic situs est) and S.T.T.L. (sit tibi terra levis) leave no doubt as to their funerary nature. The museum also holds a notable collection of votives to an indigenous divinity from the Endovelicus period located in the Sanctuary of São Miguel da Mota. Although in lesser numbers, there are also honorific epigraphs, which, amongst others, include the Civitas Ammaiensis to Emperor Claudius (part of his imperial cult).

=== Medals and coins ===
The museum has a small medals collection, its coin collection consists primarily of coins from Portugal's Roman period. There are over 30,000 Roman coins in the museum's archives, which include some of the first coins used in Lusitania. The vast majority of this collection comes from several collections from the Roman Republican period. A significant collection was found in the Santana da Carnota and in Mértola. From the late Roman period, a 3rd-century AD collection was found in Porto Carro and from the 4th century AD a collection was found in Tróia.

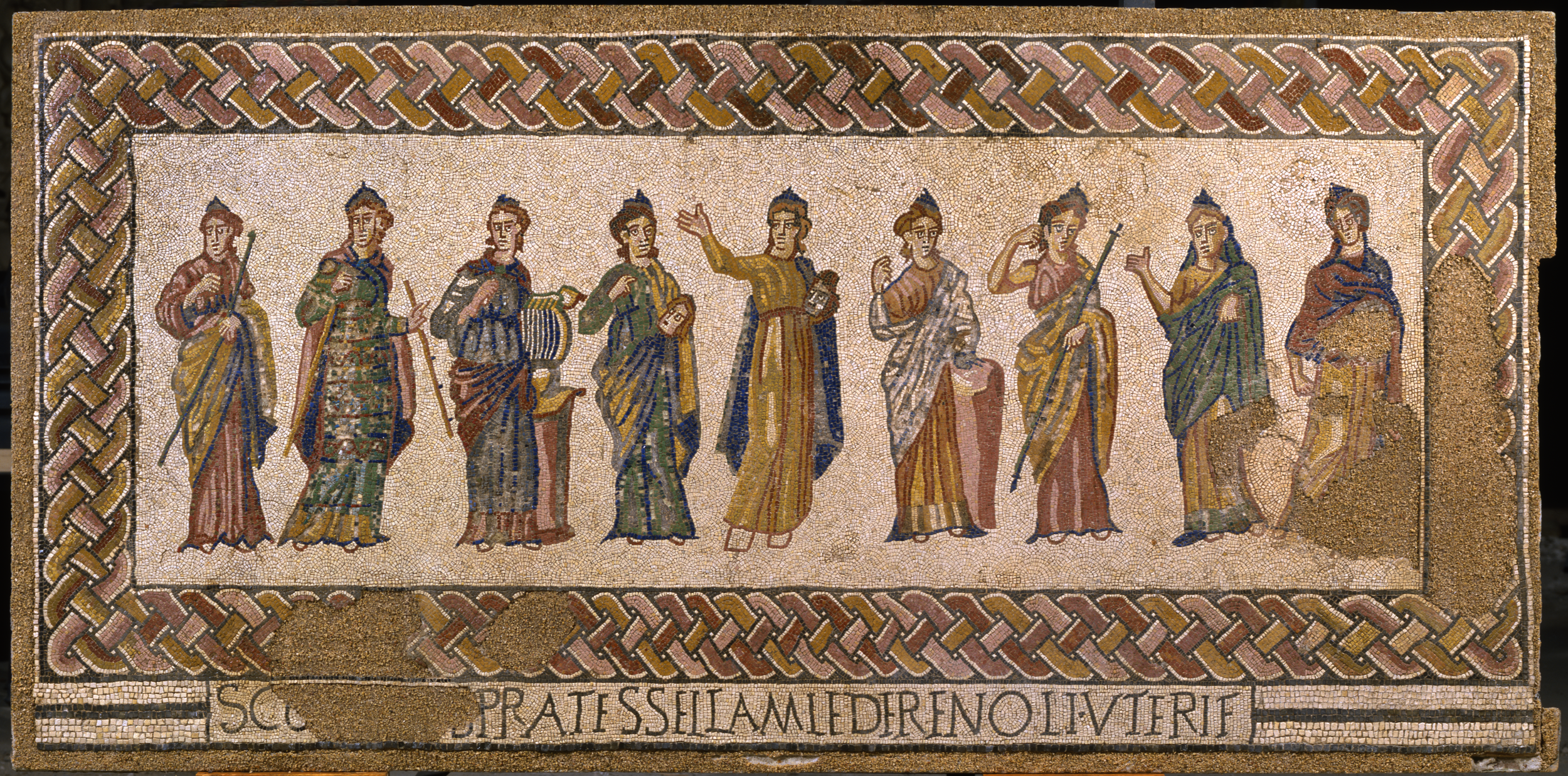
The Muses (panel I), Roman mosaic, 4th century AD

=== Organic materials ===
The fragile and difficult nature of preserving organic materials led to the development of special storage facilities in the museum, where such materials could be stored in a controlled environment. In this repository are items such as wooden step ladders and ropes from Roman mines located in Vipasca (Aljustrel), mummified remains and baskets and items made from leather belonging to the Egyptian collection.

=== Ancient Egypt ===
The collection of ancient Egyptian art contains over 500 items, of which 300 can be found on display. The collection has several origins; the bulk of the nucleus was purchased by José Leite de Vasconcelos in 1909 during his visit to Egypt, and later the collections of Queen Amélie of Orléans and of the Palmela family were added. Despite its relatively small size, this collection covers the history of Egypt from the pre-dynastic to the Coptic eras.

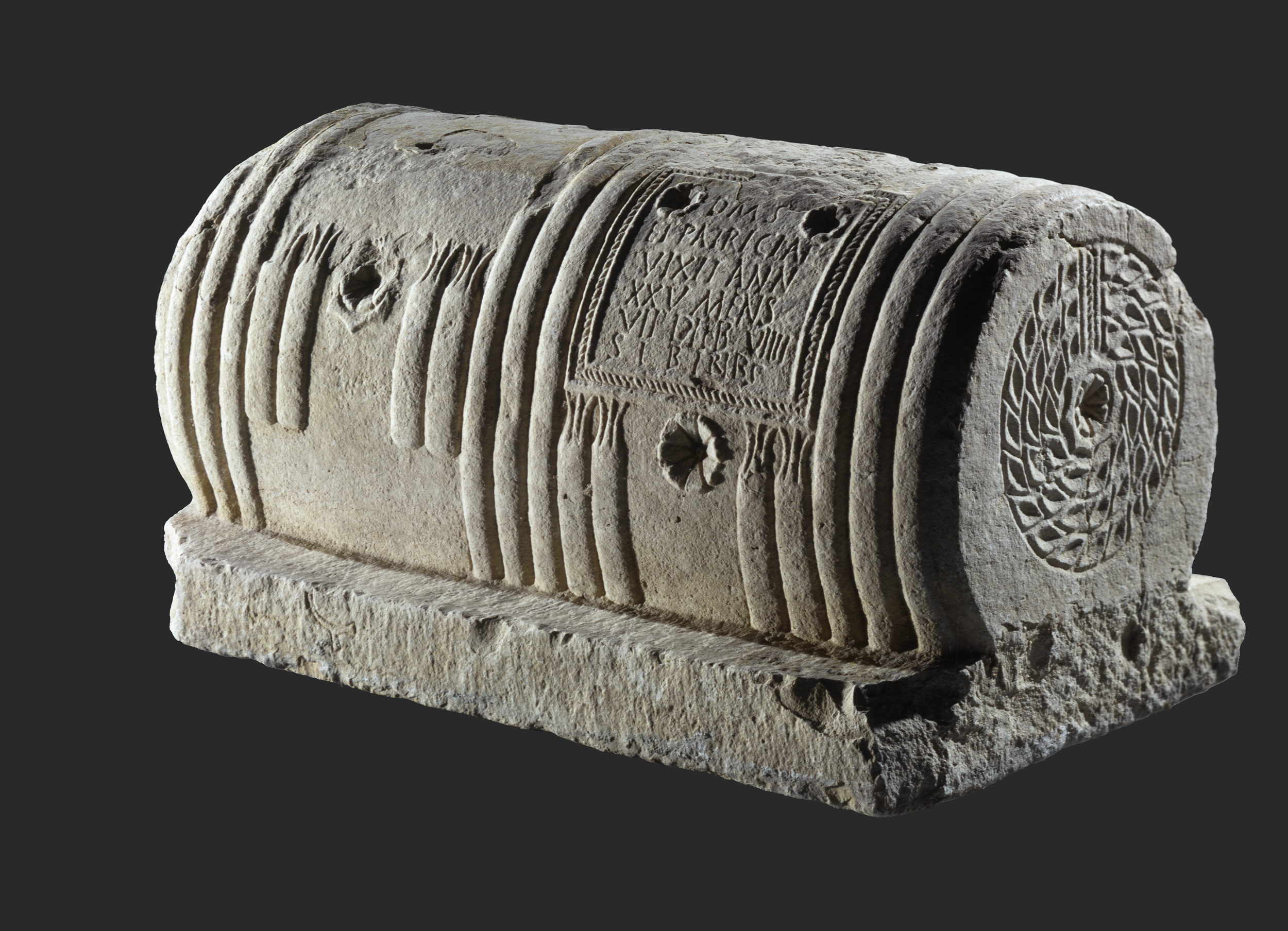
Roman Funerary Cupa, 2nd – 3rd Century AD

=== Greco-Roman world ===
The museum contains holds a diversity of items stemming from the Greco-Roman Mediterranean from the Classical and Pre-Classical period. In this collection are, amongst others, the items collected by José Leite de Vasconcelos in Greece, along with items purchased at auction, including an ancient Panathenaic amphora originating from Pompeii or Herculaneum.

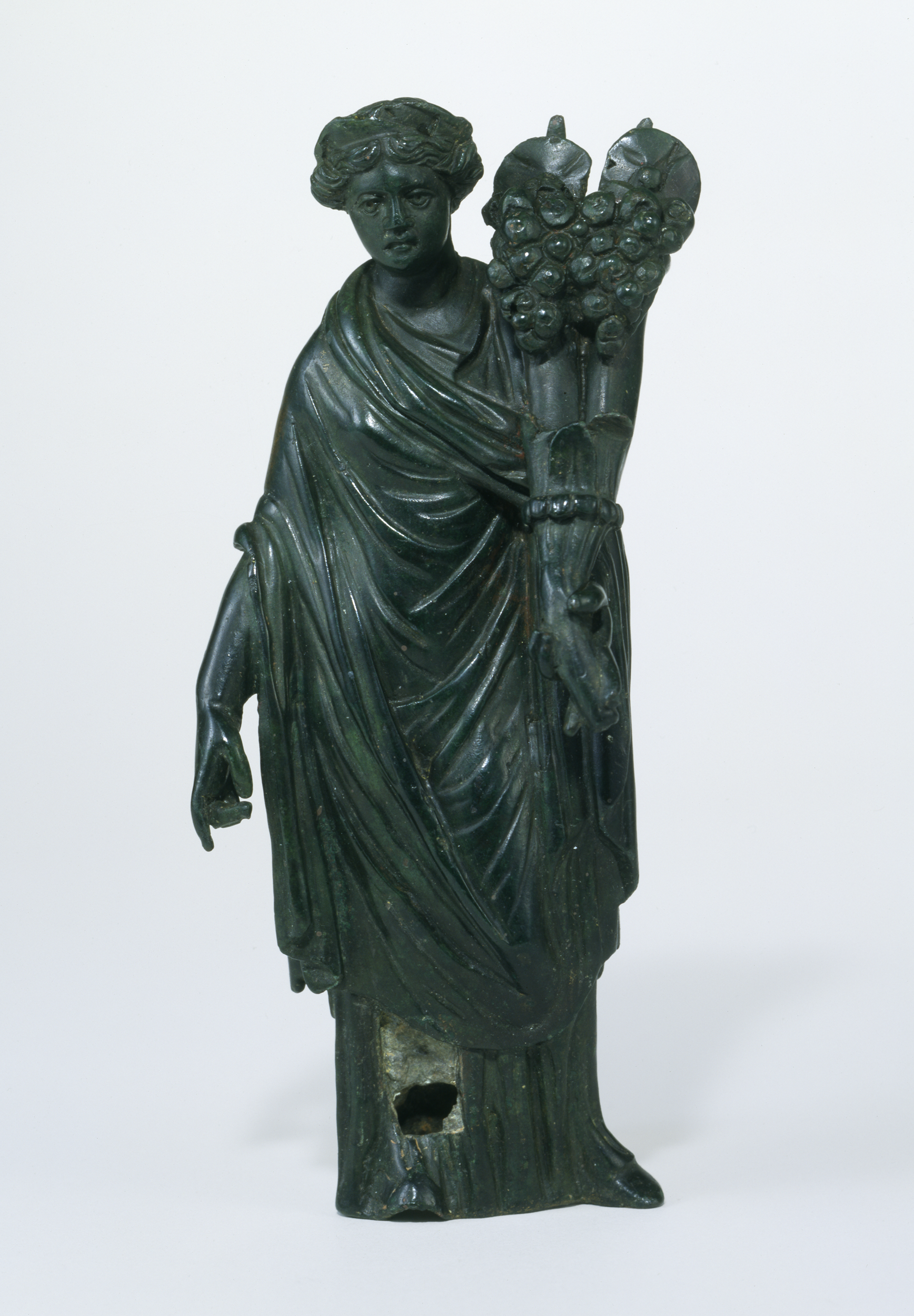
Fortuna, 1st century AD, Roman period

=== Ethnography ===
Ethnography was central to the museum's original underpinnings. José Leite de Vasconcelos traveled through numerous regions obtaining artifacts that now form the core of the National Museum of Archaeology and the National Museum of Ethnology's collections. Of particular note are the collections of popular religious art, which contain religious iconography, votive offerings, votive panels and amulets; pastoral arts (spoons, horns, gunpowder horns); items with keys; musical instruments (including an 18th-century accordion) toys; smoking paraphernalia; Portuguese faience from the 17th to 20th centuries from several factories and periods; and pottery from Barcelos, Gaia, Caldas da Rainha, Mafra, Nisa, Estremoz, Redondo and the Algarve.

There are also African artworks. Of particular importance is the Tshokwe sculpture representing the warrior Tshibinda Ilunga.

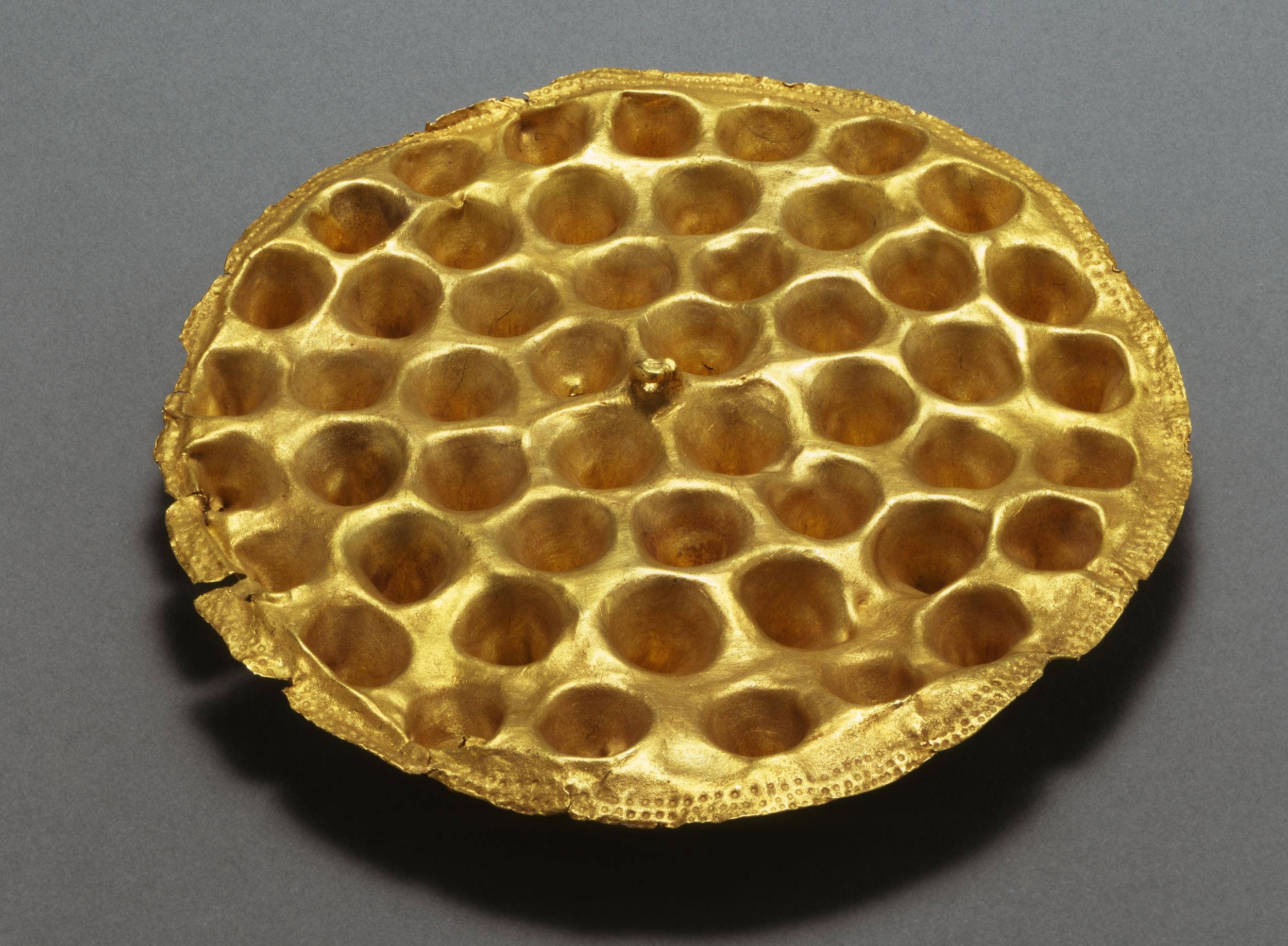
Discal element, Bronze Age

=== Amphorae ===
The collection of amphora in the National Museum of Archaeology is an important testament of the socio-economic relations between the province of Lusitania and the great economic epicenters of the Roman world. Lusitania spanned the Atlantic and Mediterranean coasts and left archaeological remains dating from the 1st century BC to the 5th century AD.

The amphorae in the museum's collections are today part of a collective study on the complex maritime trade routes of the Roman Empire. Archaeological sites in Mértola, Castro Marim, Torre de Ares and Troia have revealed commercial ties between the eastern and western Mediterranean and the north of Africa through the import of the famous Baetic olive oil and wine, found in amphorae of types Dressel 20, Dressel 14, Haltern 70 and Africana I and II. The many amphorae created in Lusitania, of types Almagro 51 C, Almagro 51 a-b, Lusitana 3, Almagro 50 and Dressel 14, were used to store a range of goods, from fish conserves to luxury products such as scented sauces referred to by classic writers as garum ou o liquamen.

== Location ==
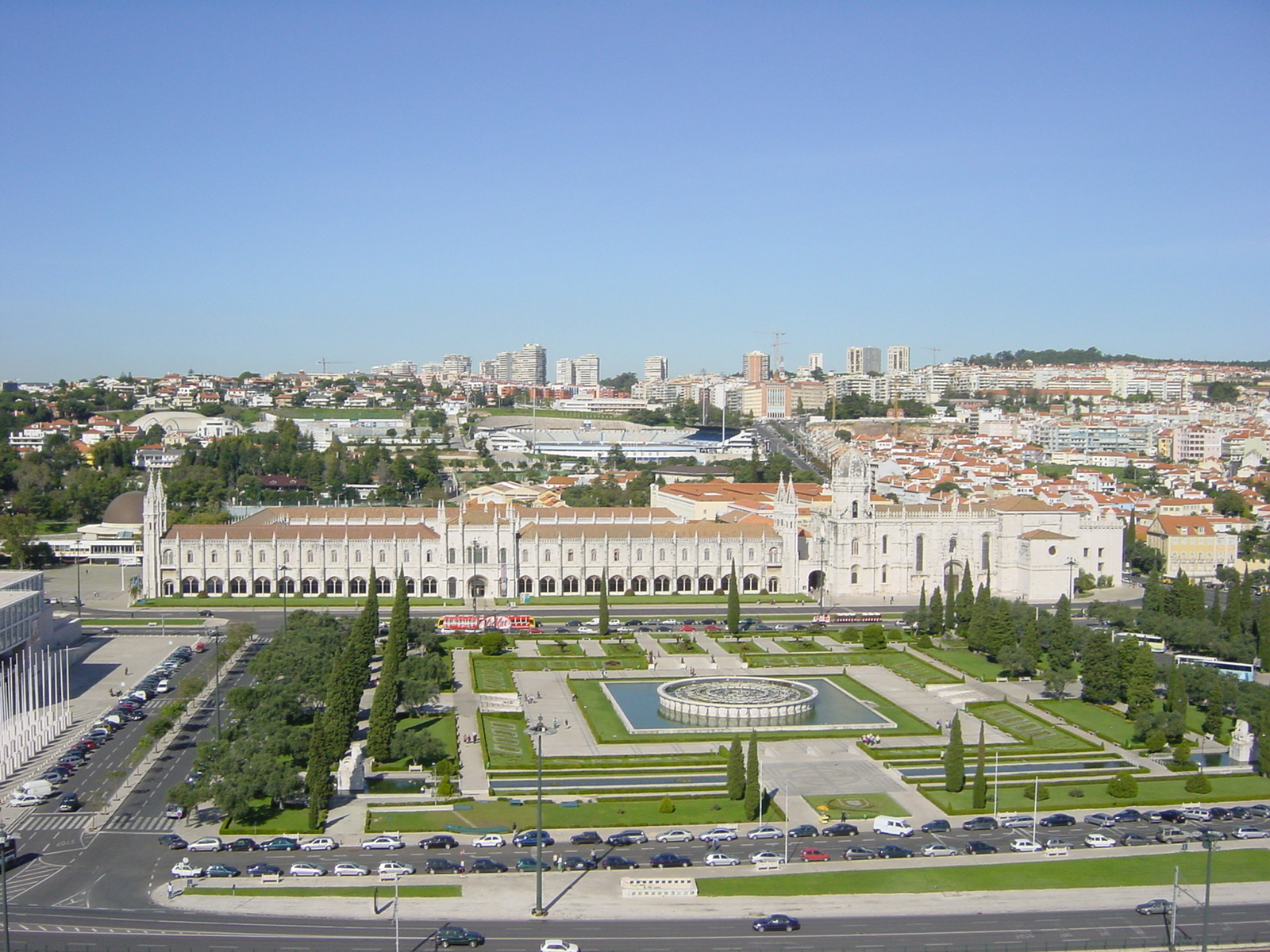
The Praça do Império in the Belém freguesia where the Museum is located

The museum is located in Lisbon in Santa Maria de Belém in the Mosteiro dos Jerónimos, a 19th-century building, which was granted by the government to the museum on 20 November 1900. The museum takes up almost the whole of the part of the Mosteiro dos Jerónimos that faces the Praça do Império. This is an area of high tourism traffic on account of its multiple museums and heritage sites.

Throughout the years, the National Museum of Archaeology has been the subject of multiple reorganizations of its space and collection. The National Museum of Archaeology was originally based in Lisbon's Academy of Sciences in room provided by the Geological Commission. In 1903 it moved to the Mosteiro dos Jerónimos, and on 22 April 1906 it opened its doors to the public. However, because the museum became the national repository of archaeological finds, its collection grew significantly. To overcome the physical limitations of its facilities, it was suggested in the 1950s that the museum move part of its collection to the Lisbon University campus. It has also been suggested that the museum move to the Cordoaria Nacional.

== Mission ==
The museum was conceived by José Leite de Vasconcelos to be the "Museum of Portuguese Man", a dream that grew as his archaeological work progressed. Its name has changed over the years, and in 1989 the museum was renamed the National Museum of Archaeology - Dr. Leite de Vasconcelos.

The directors that followed supported many archaeological excavations, the finds of which entered the museum. The majority of research carried out, however, has focused primarily on the museum's existing collection. The museum continues today with the same basic mission: to tell the history of people in Portugal's national territory, from their origins to the birth of the nation.

The country's main center for archaeological research is located within the museum. Besides research and education, the museum is the national repository and space for exhibitions of an archaeological nature. The museum has published the periodical Portuguese Archaeologist since 1895.

== Gifts and donations ==
The National Museum of Archaeology has, in its short history, benefitted from several important gifts and donations. Of particular importance have been the donations of António Bustorff Silva, D. Luis Bramão and the Samuel Levy family.

== Selected works ==
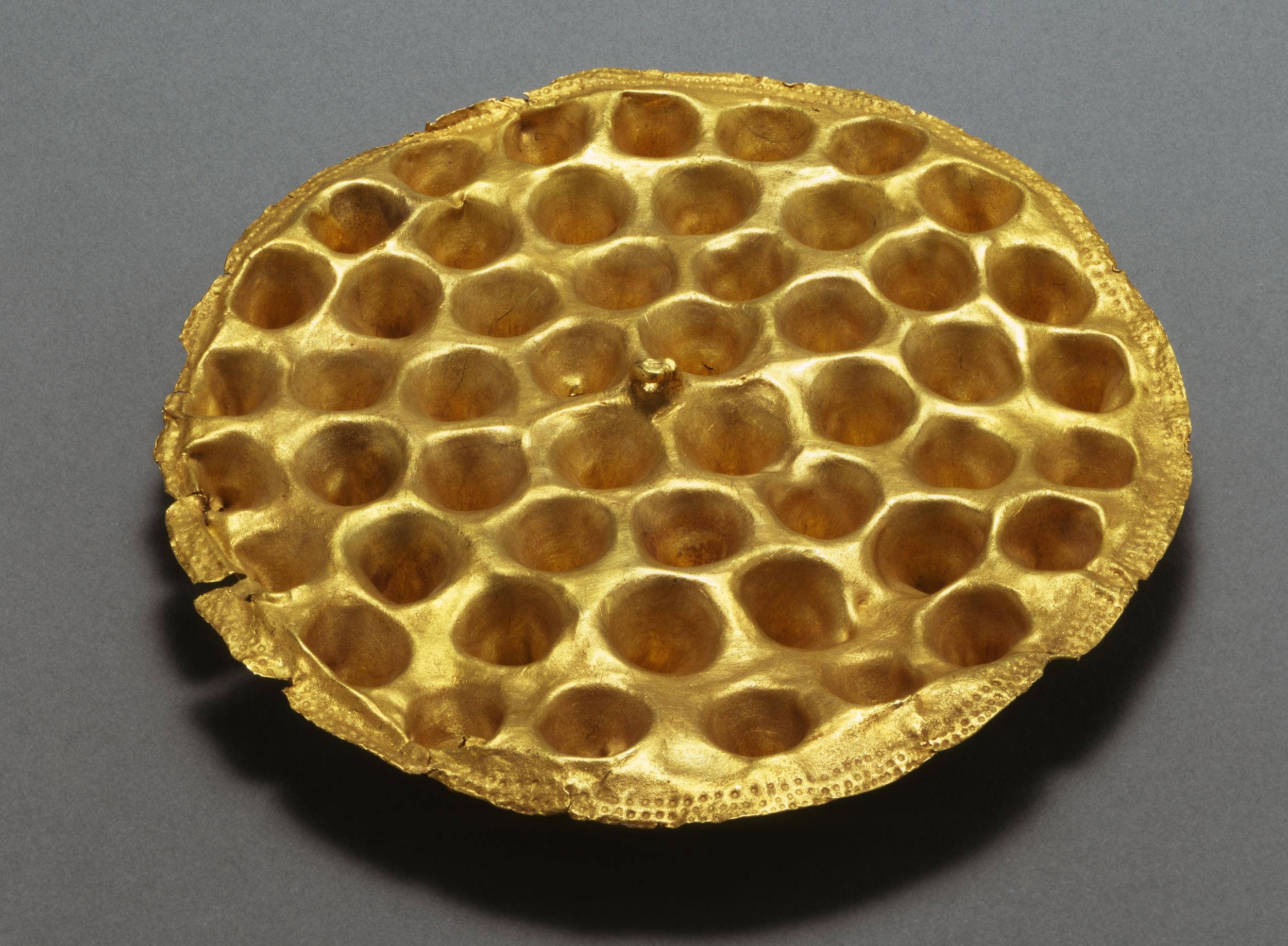
Gold disc (verso), Bronze Age

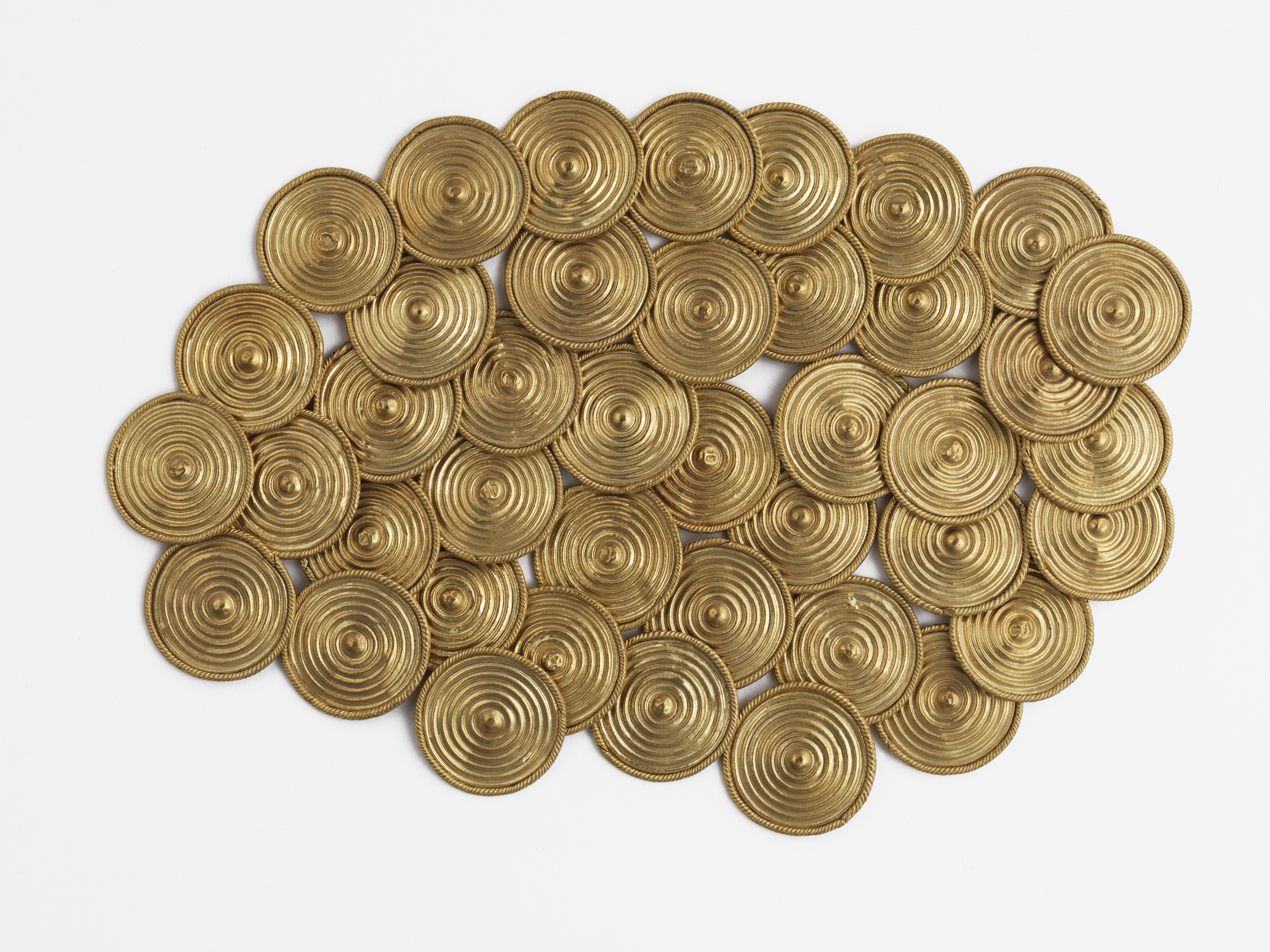
Set of buttons, gold leaf, Iron Age

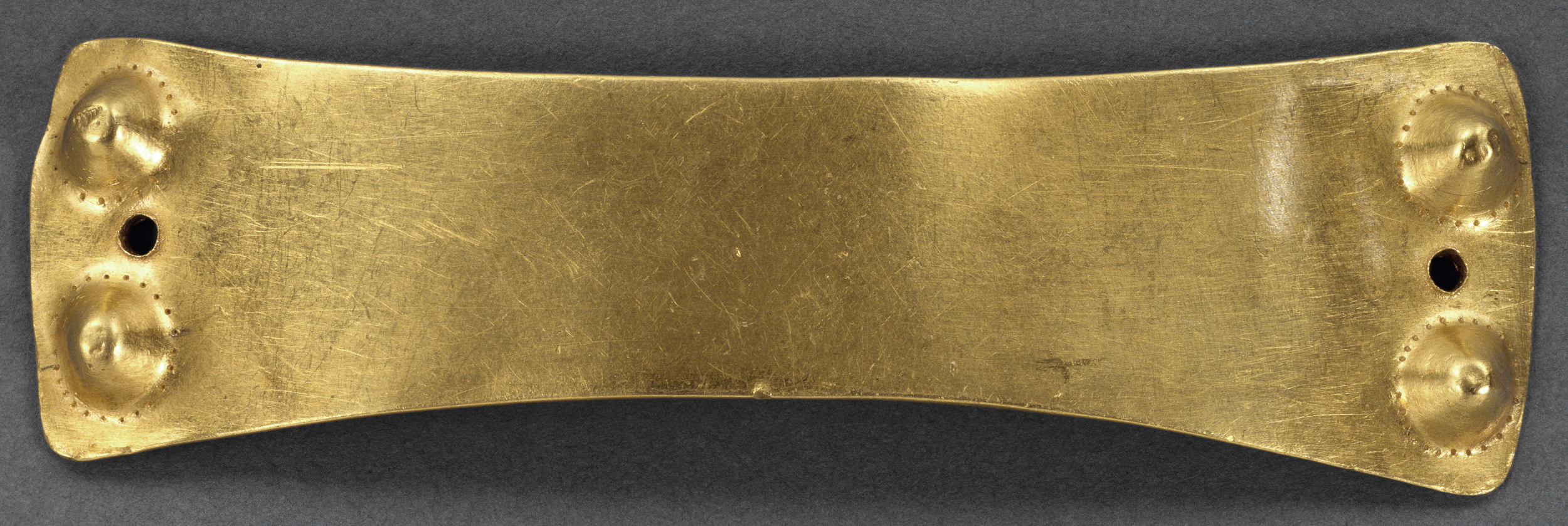
Archer's pull-handle (verso), Bronze Age

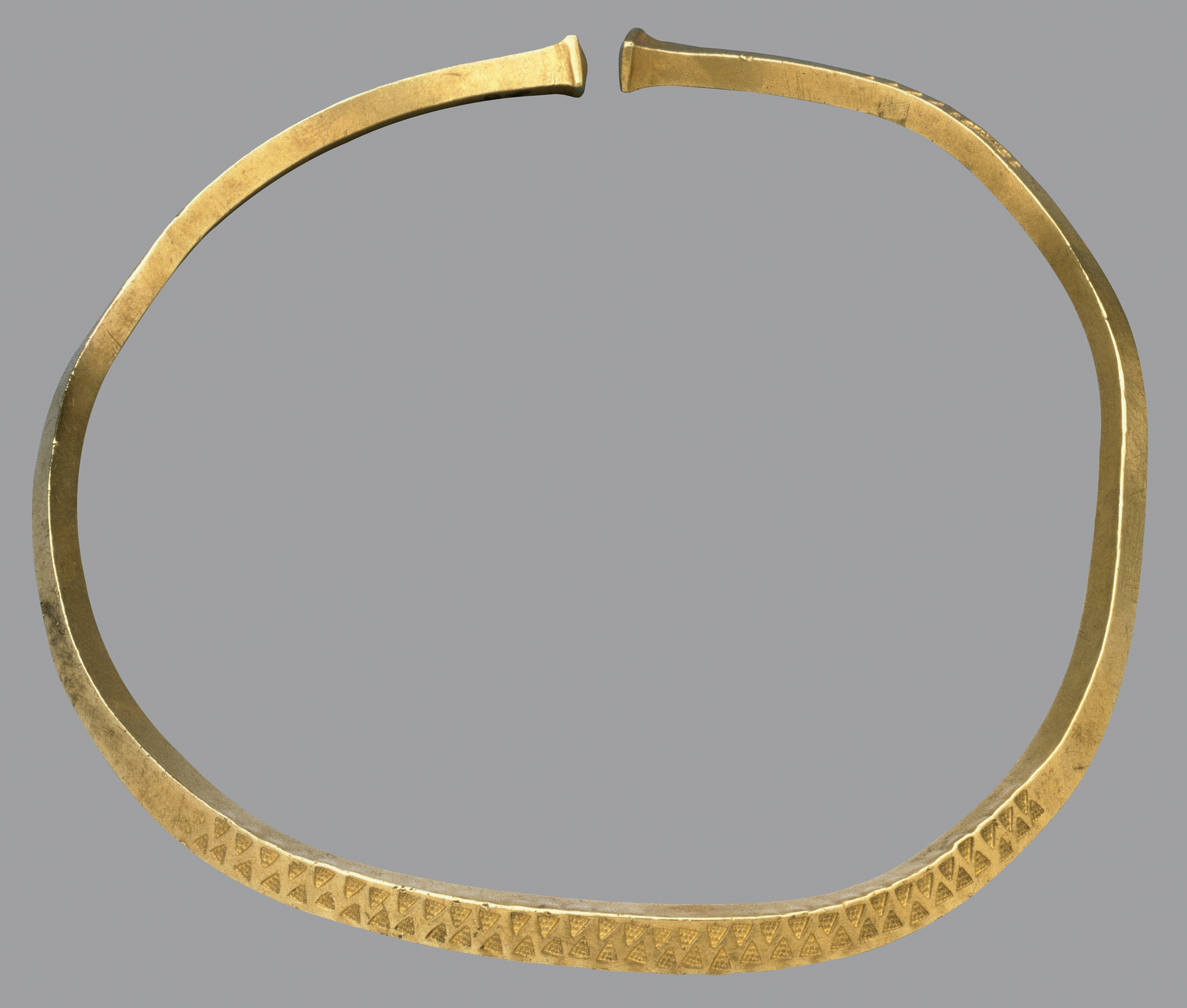
Gold necklace, Iron Age

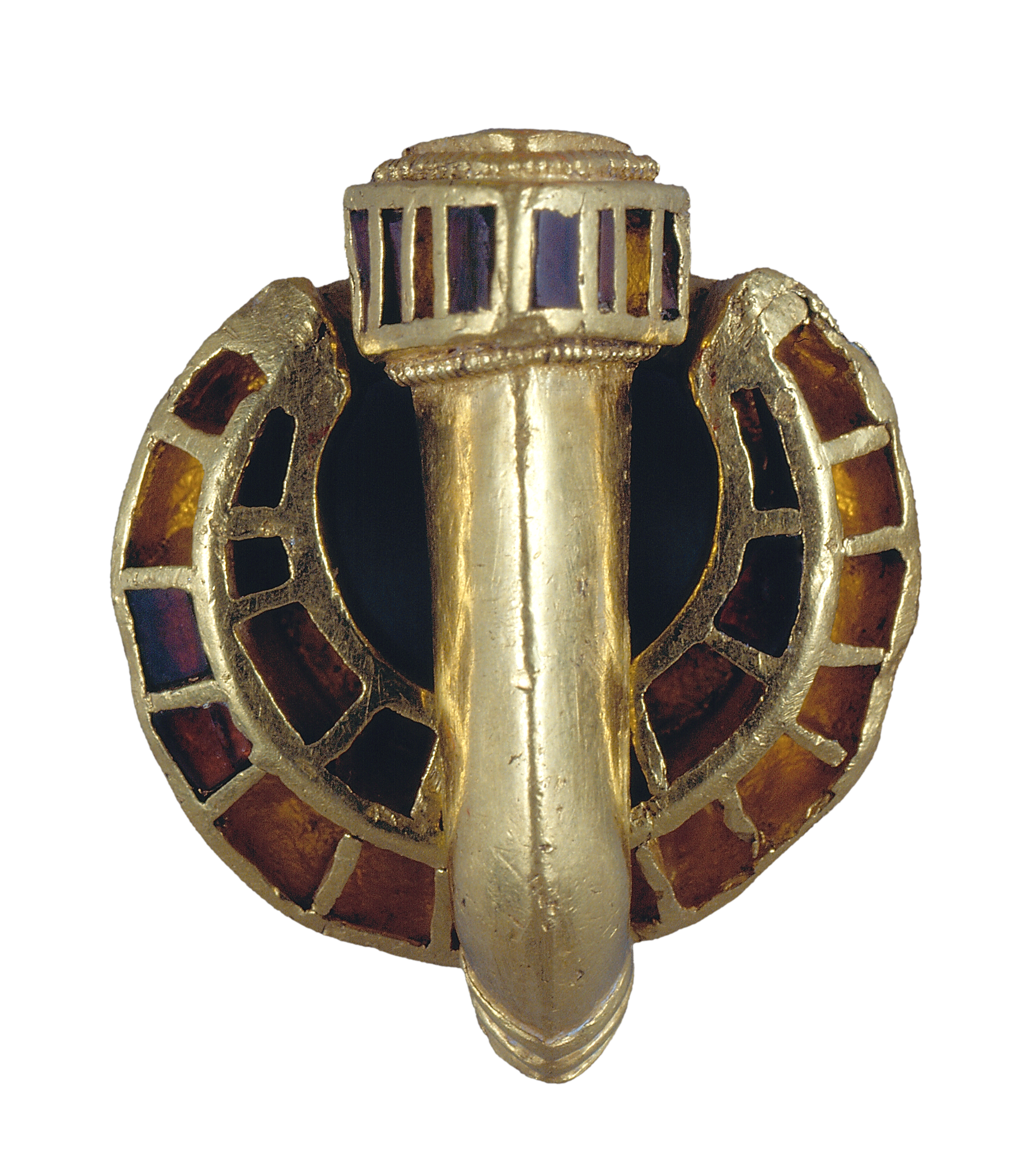
Gold and garnet belt buckle, late antiquity

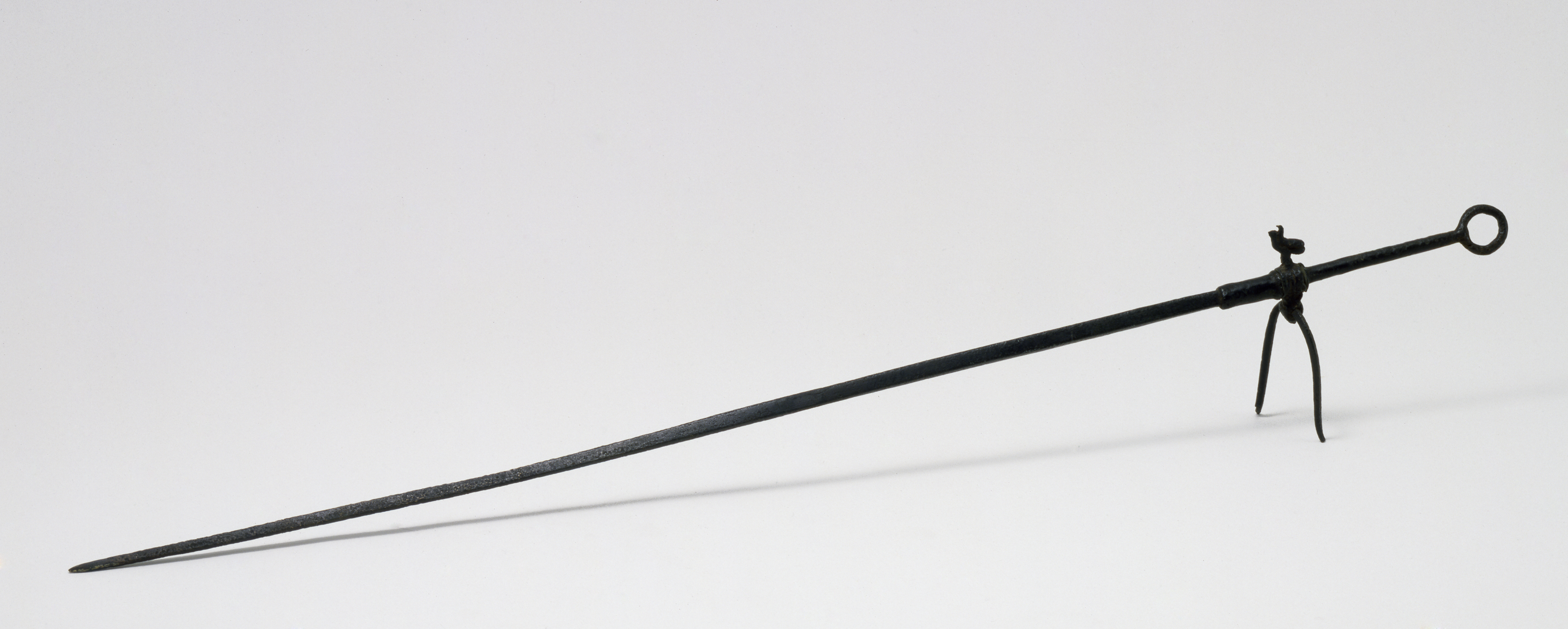
Skewer with a bronze stand, late Bronze Age

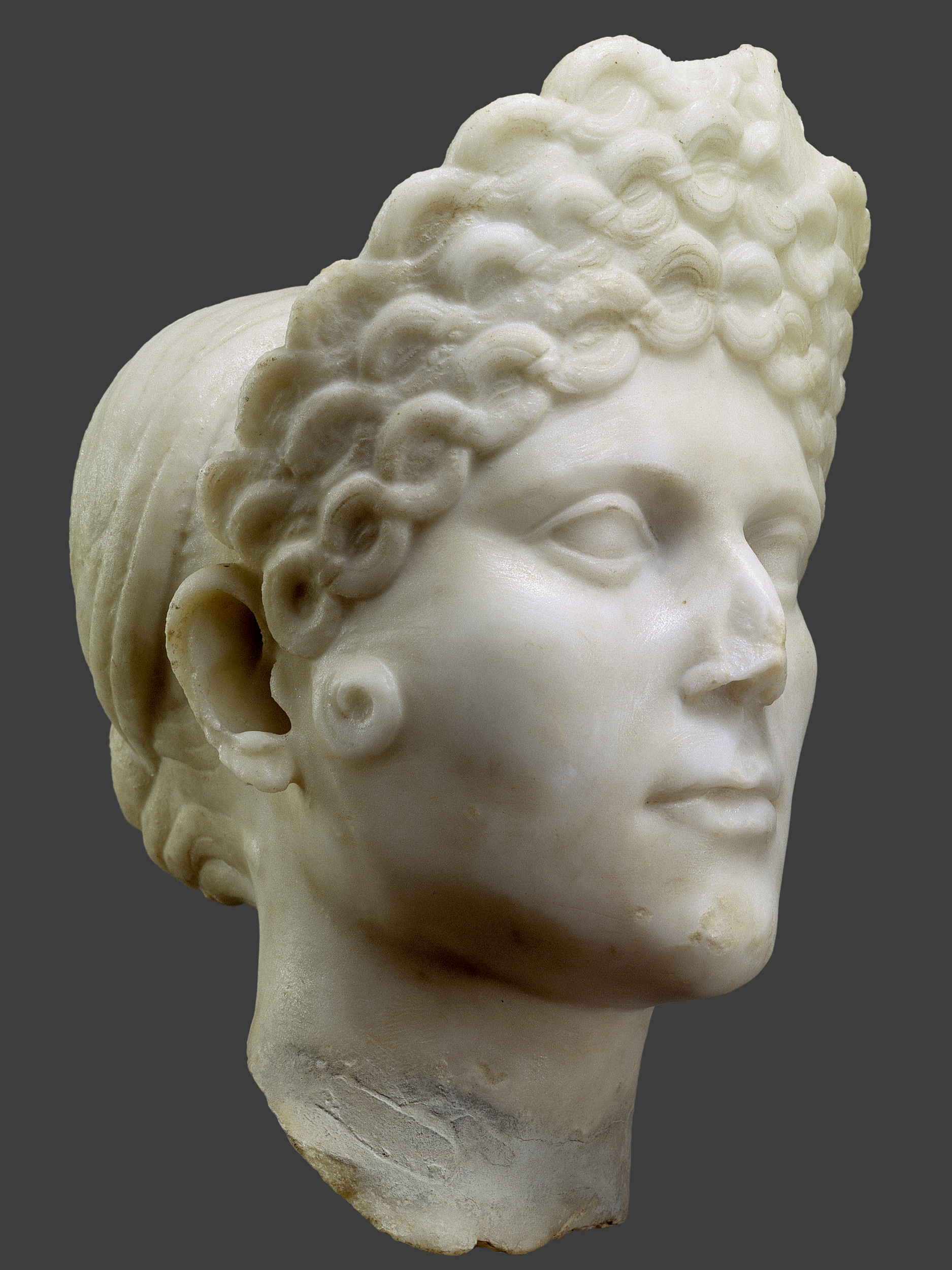
Female bust (Julia), 1st–2nd centuries AD, Lusitania, Roman period

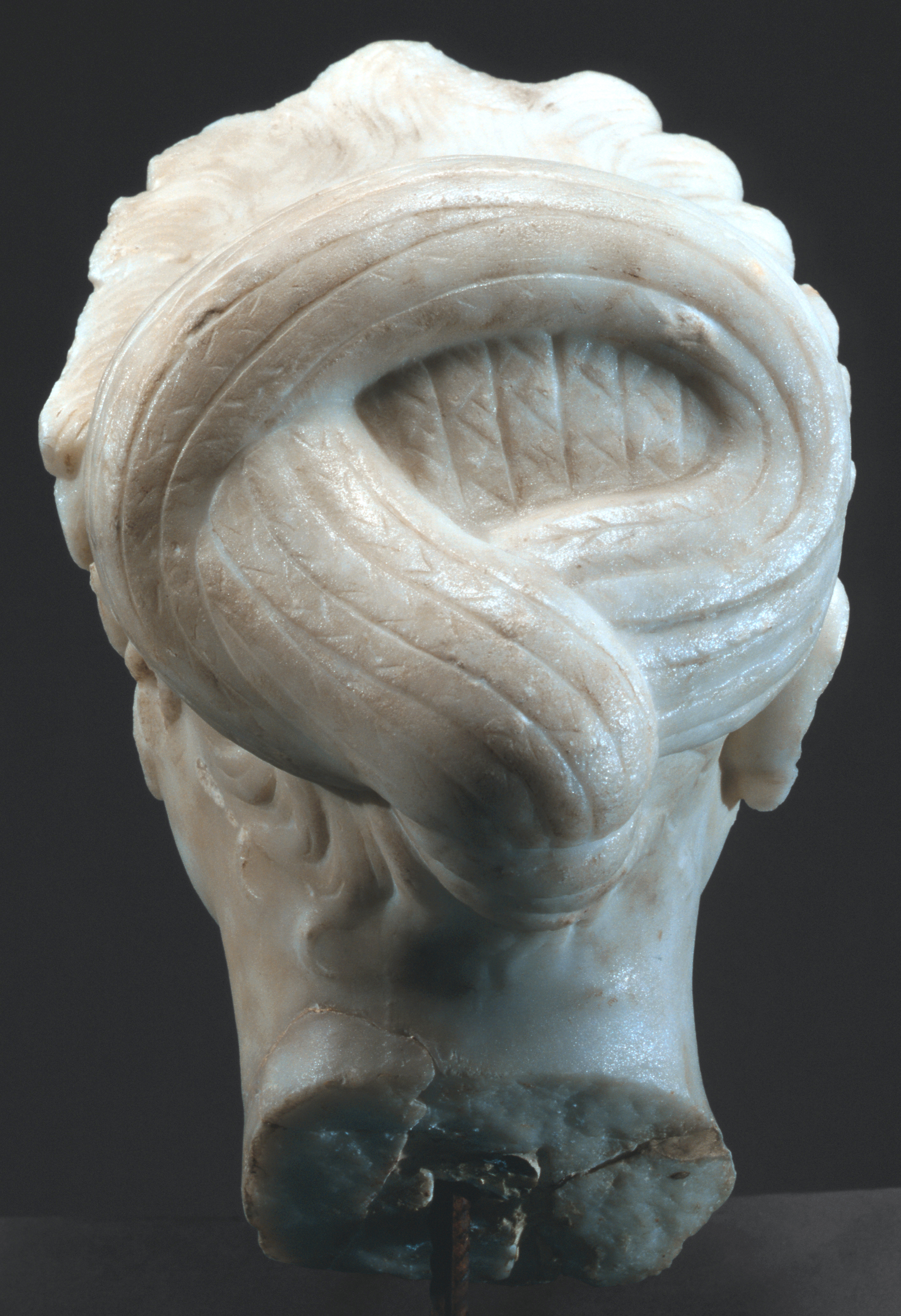
Female bust (Julia), verso, 1st–2nd centuries AD, Lusitania, Roman period

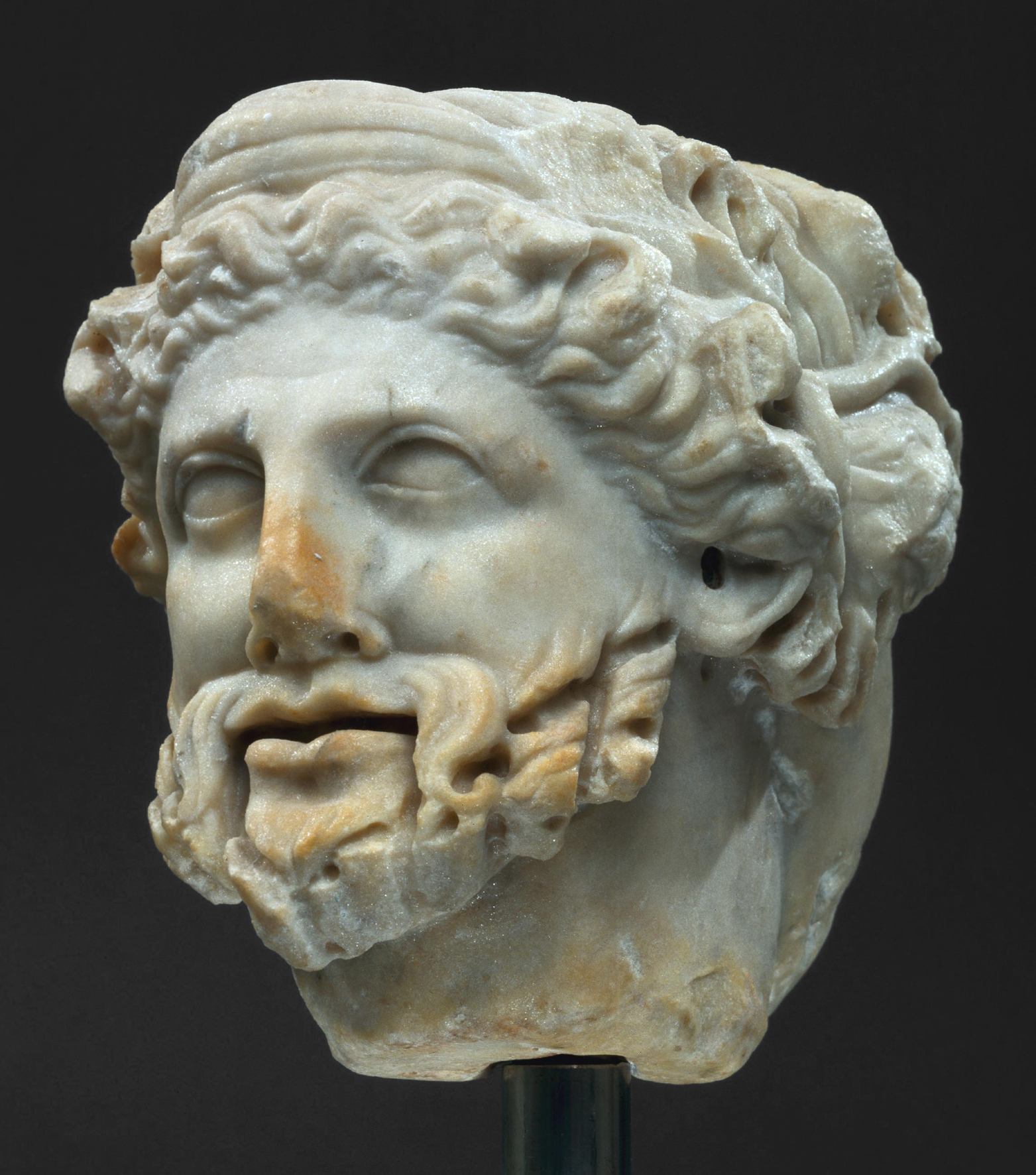
Male bust (Dionysus), 1st century AD, Roman period

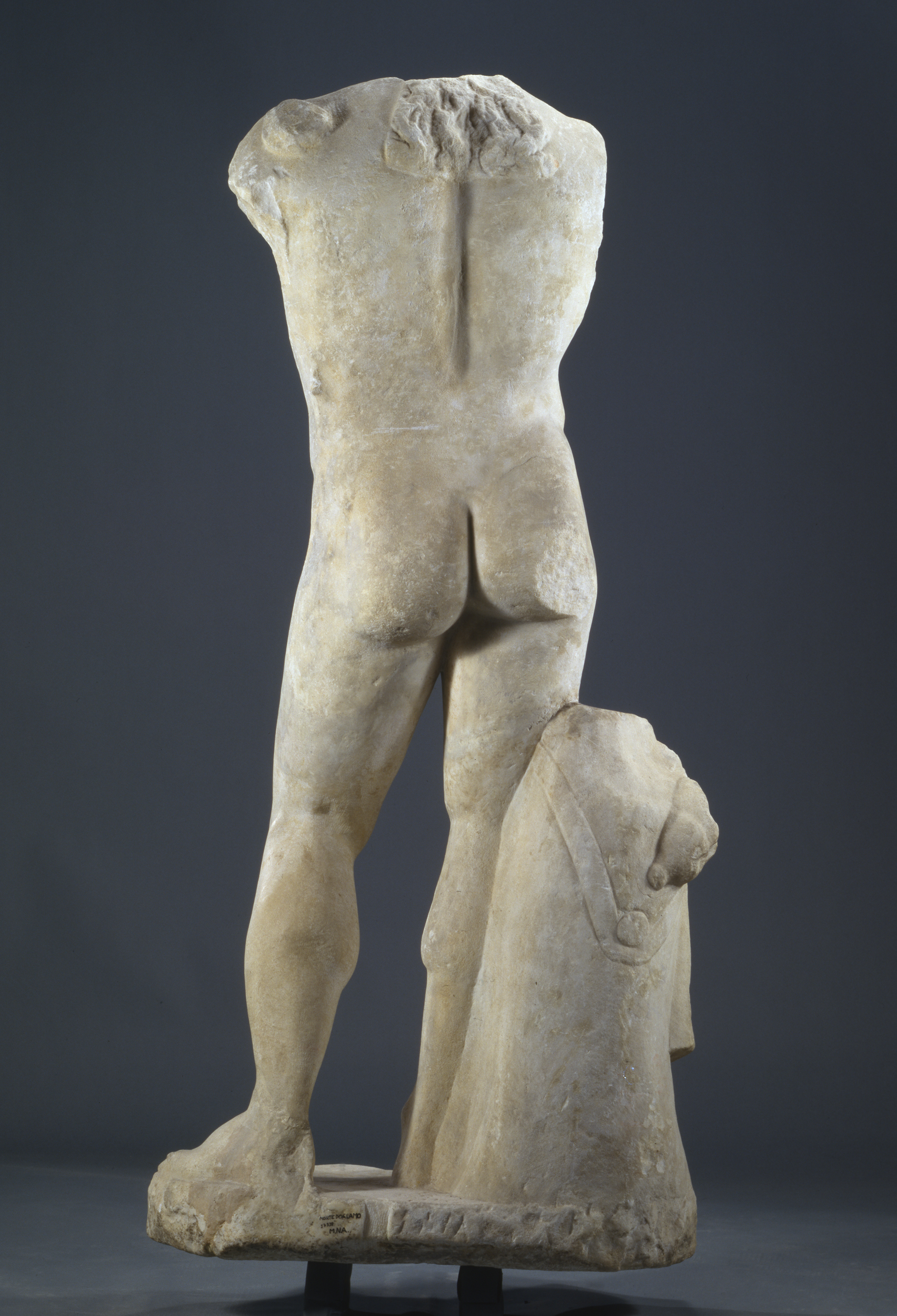
Statue of Apollo, 2nd century AD, white marble, Roman period

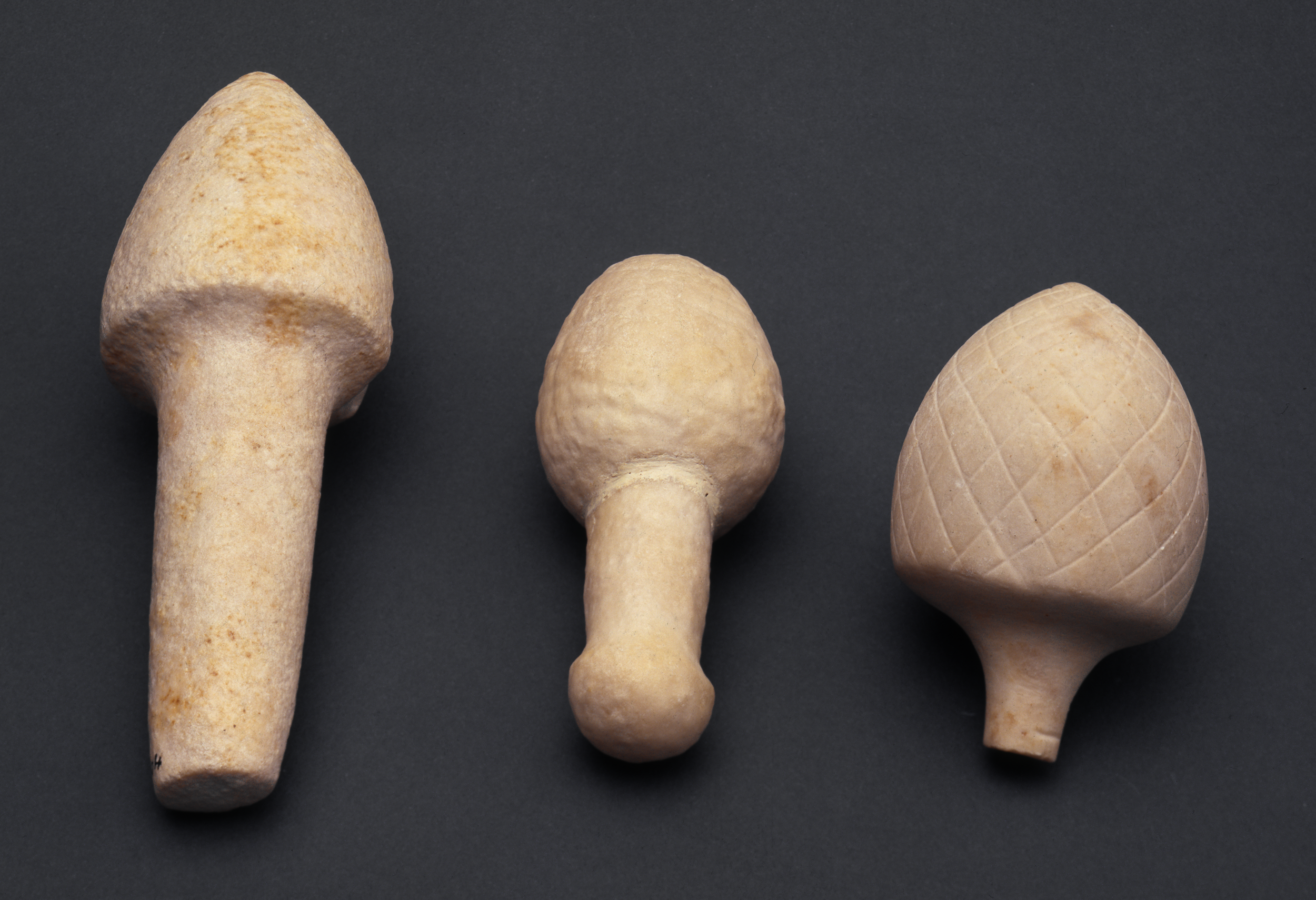
Set of pine-shaped votives, 3rd century BC, Copper Age

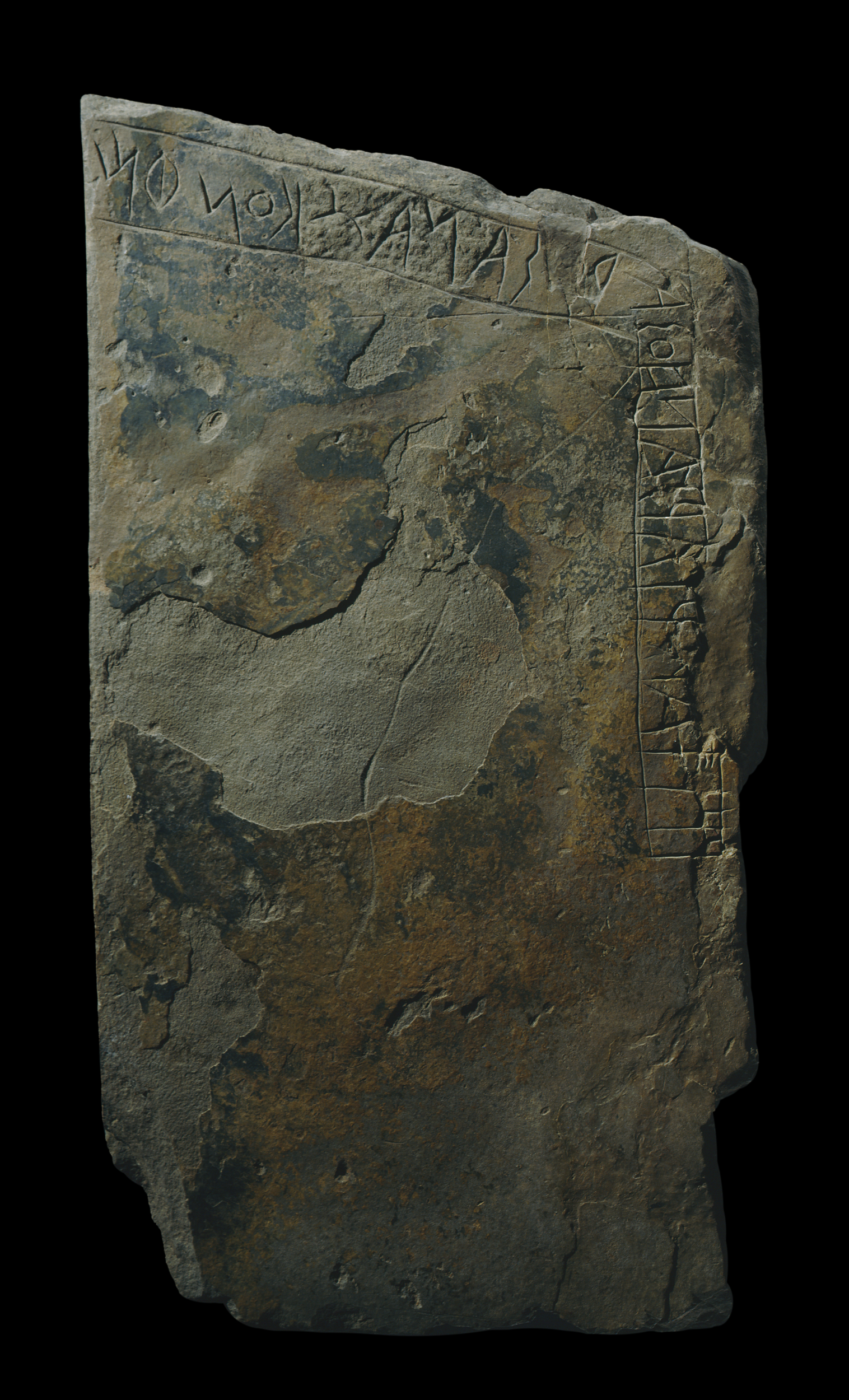
Iron Age epigraphic, black slate, Iron Age

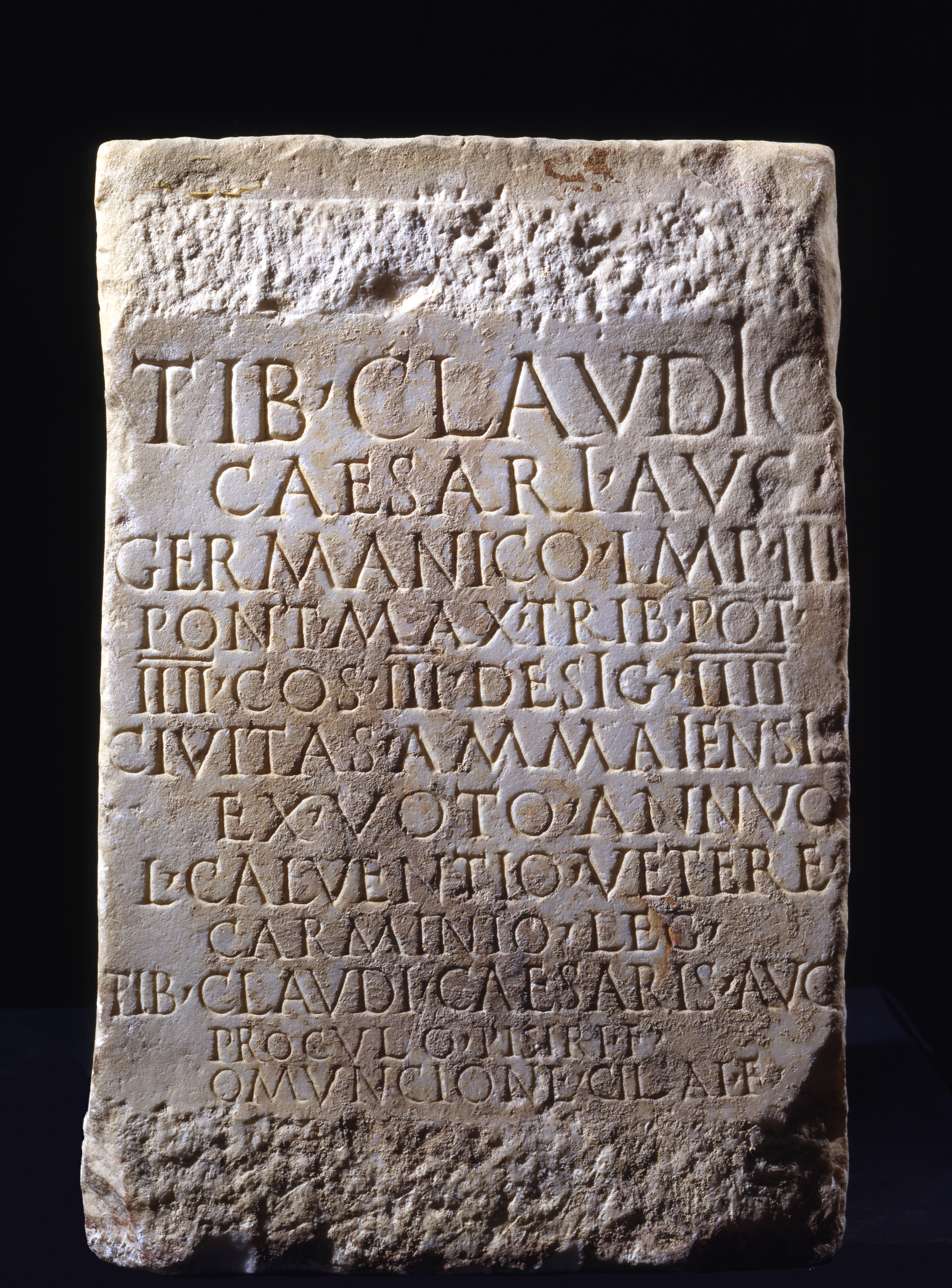
Altar to Tiberius Claudius, 3rd century AD, Roman period

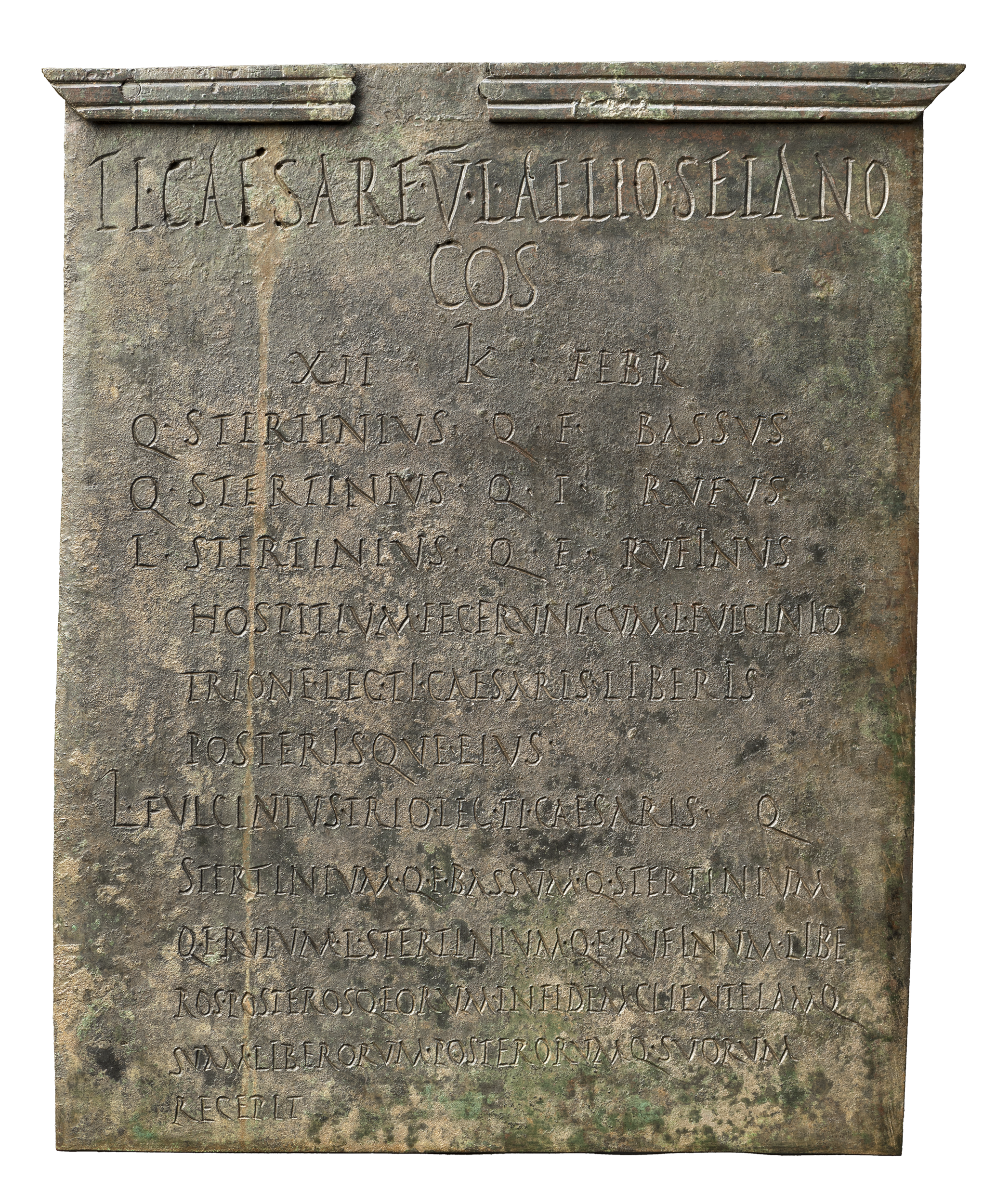
Hospitality plaque, Roman period

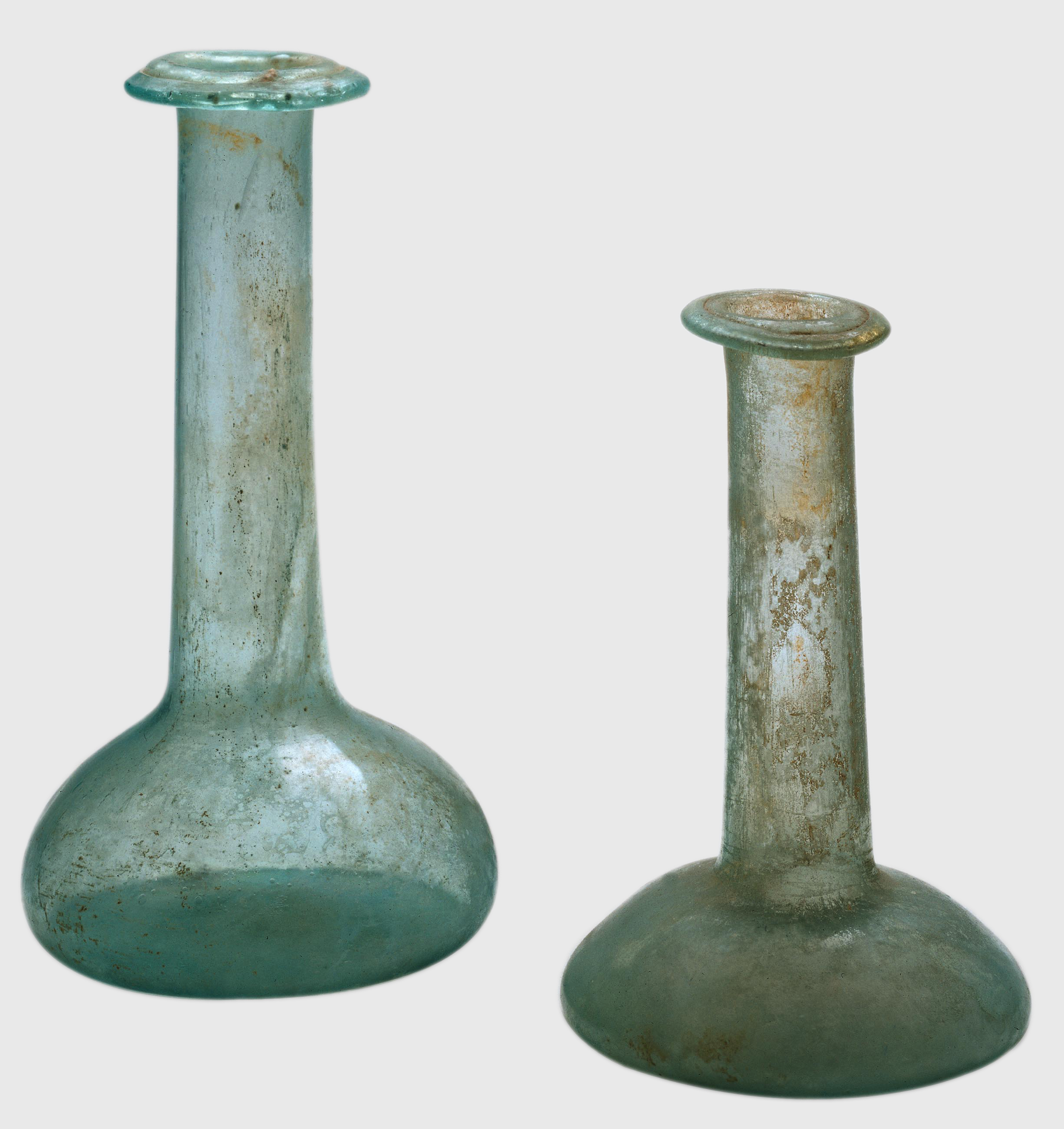
Unguentarium from the grave of Pombalinho, Roman period

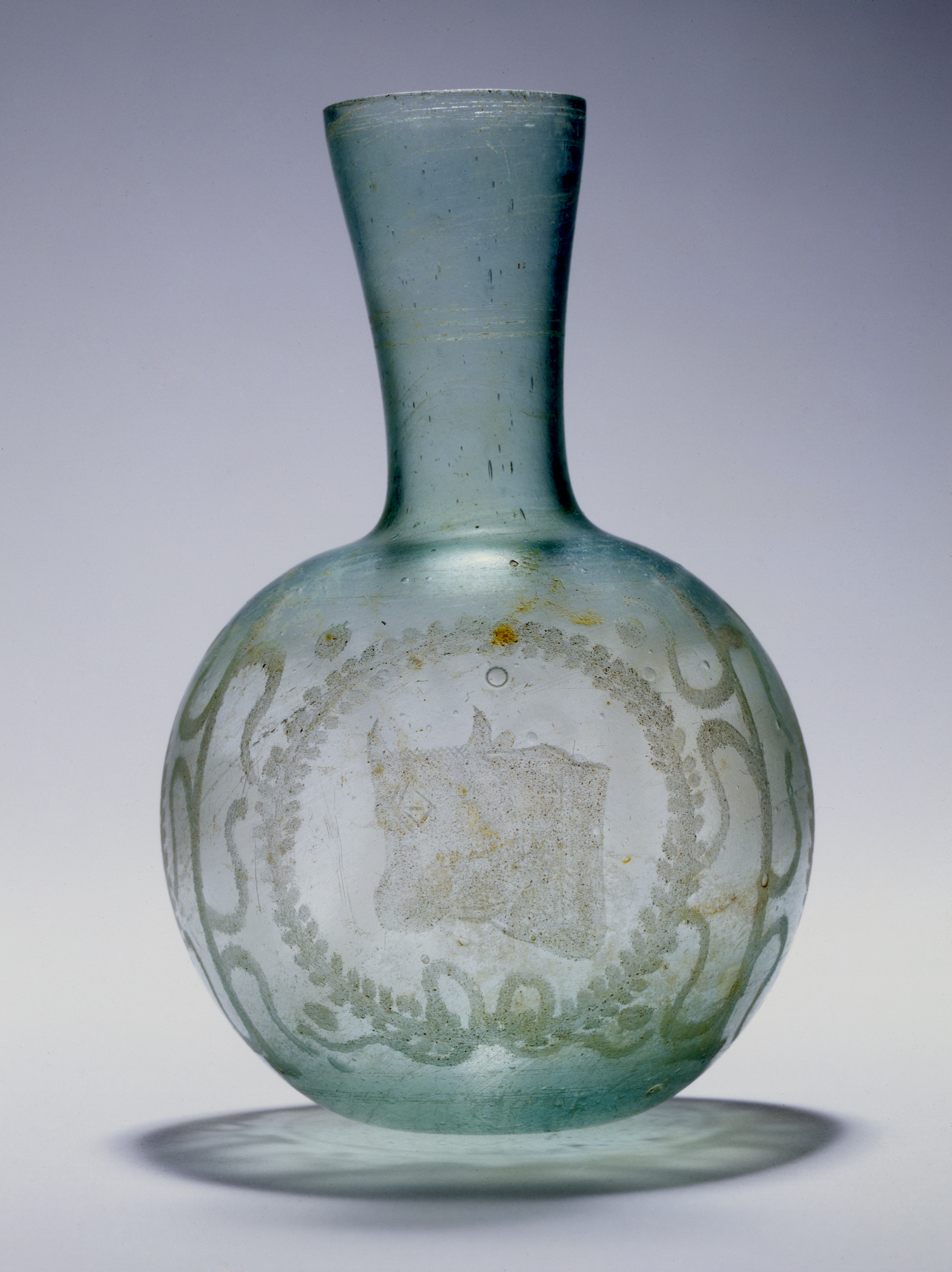
Glass bottle, Roman period

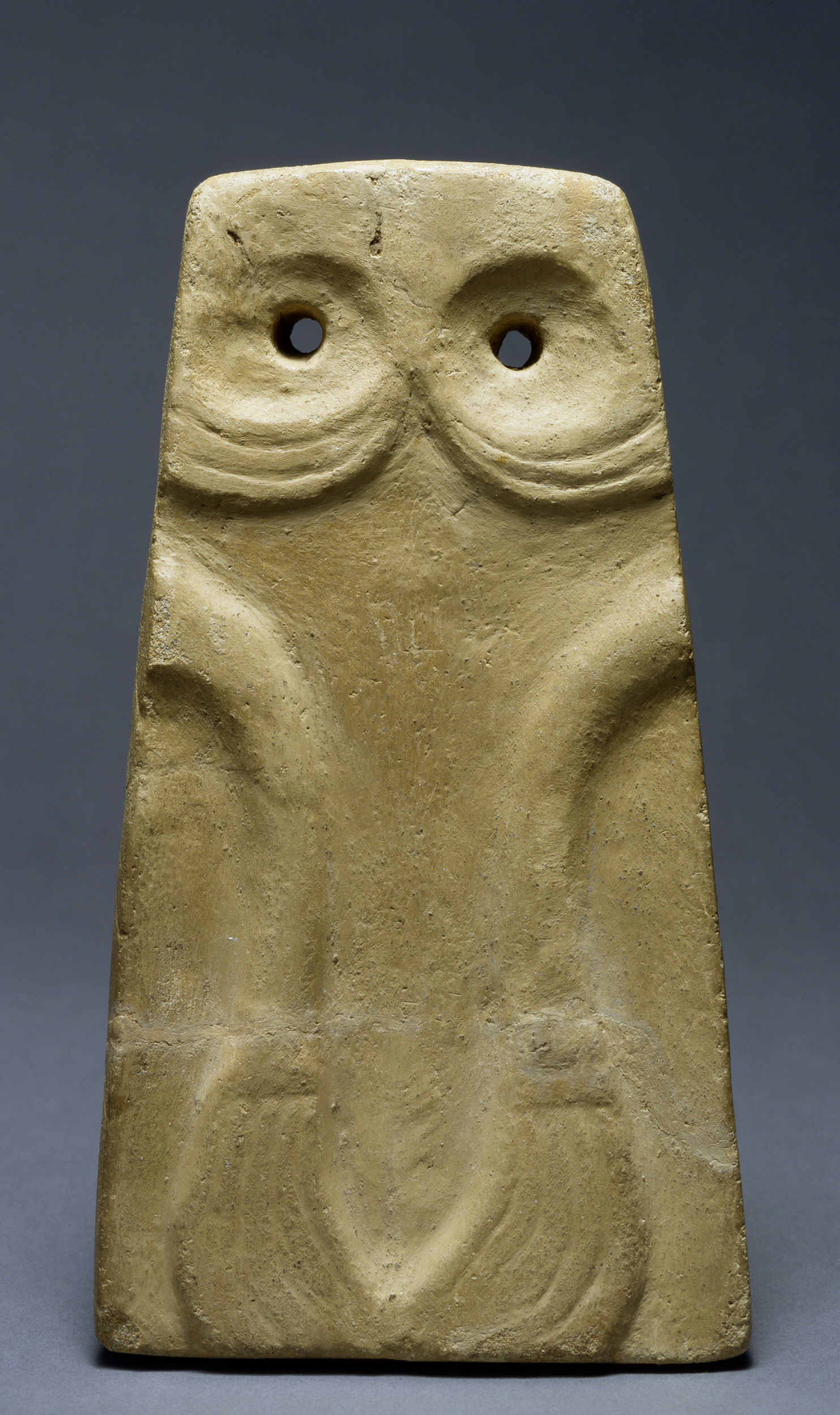
Anthropomorphic Plaque

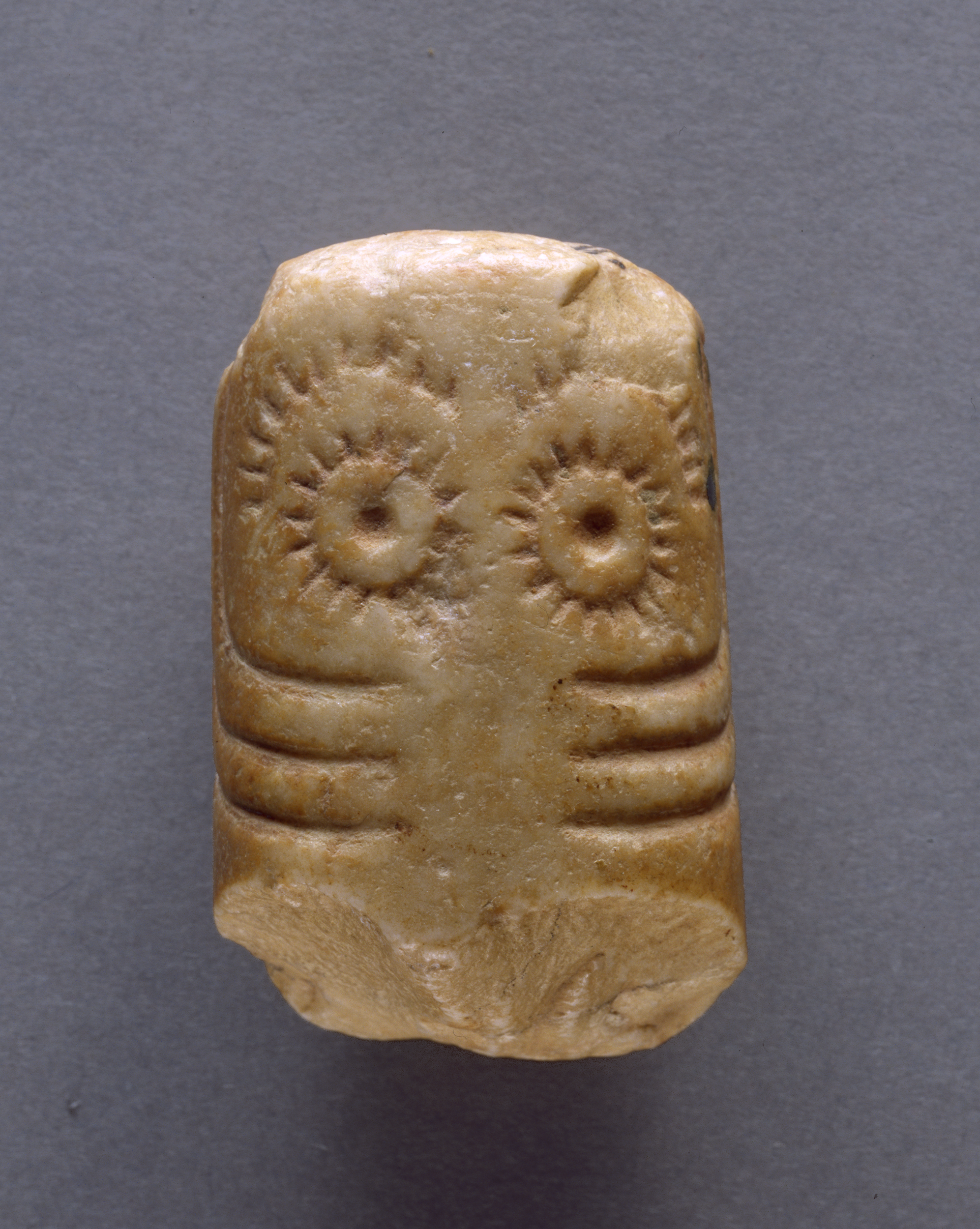
Anthropomorphic Idol

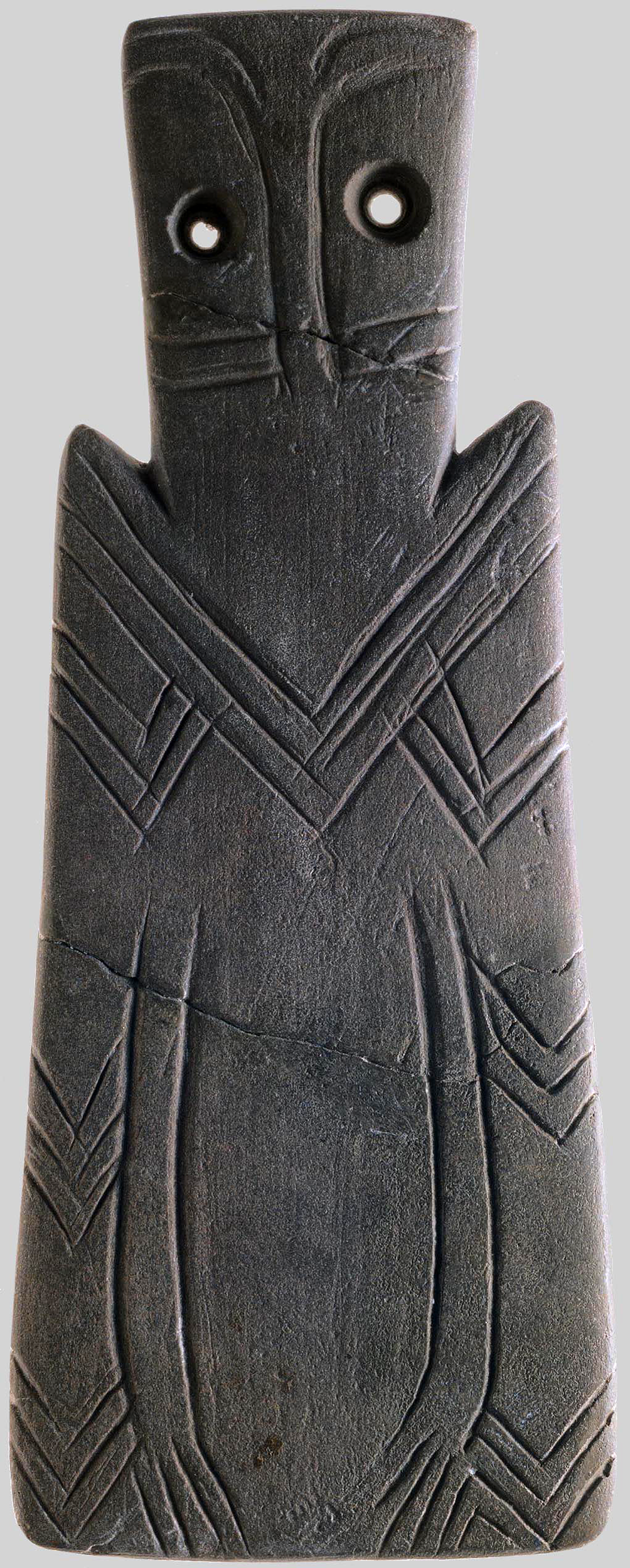
Anthropomorphic Schist Plaque with arms and hands represented along the body.

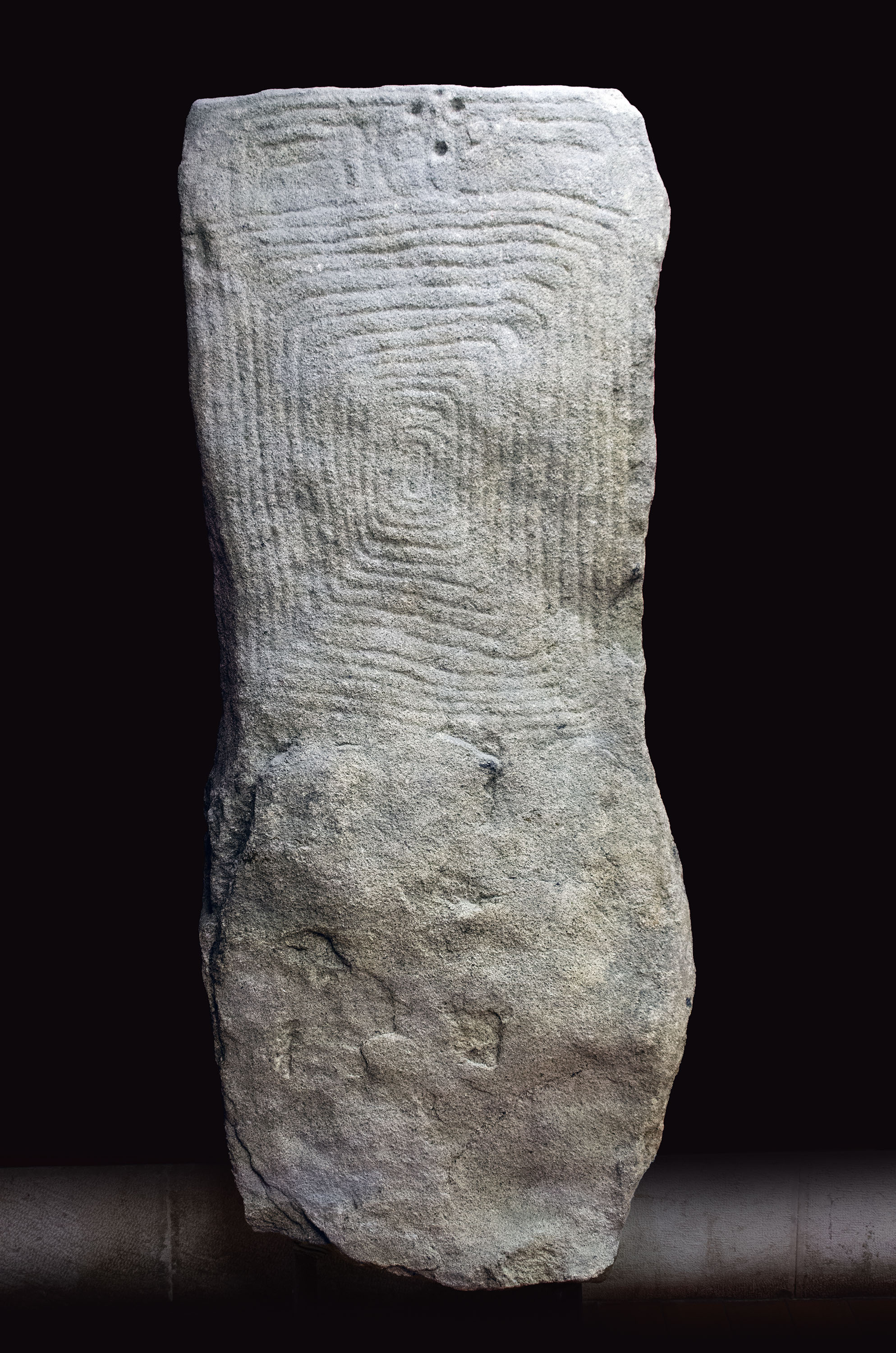
Stele. Casal de Insalde (c. 4th millennium BC)

== See also ==
- Balsa (Roman town)
- Carmo Archaeological Museum
- Castro Culture
- Lusitania
- Lusitanians
- Lusitanian language
- Lusitanian mythology
- History of Portugal
- Timeline of Portuguese history
- Portugal
- Pre-historic Iberia
- Romanization of Hispania
- Tartessian
