= José Leite de Vasconcelos =

Portuguese ethnographer, archaeologist and author (1858–1941)

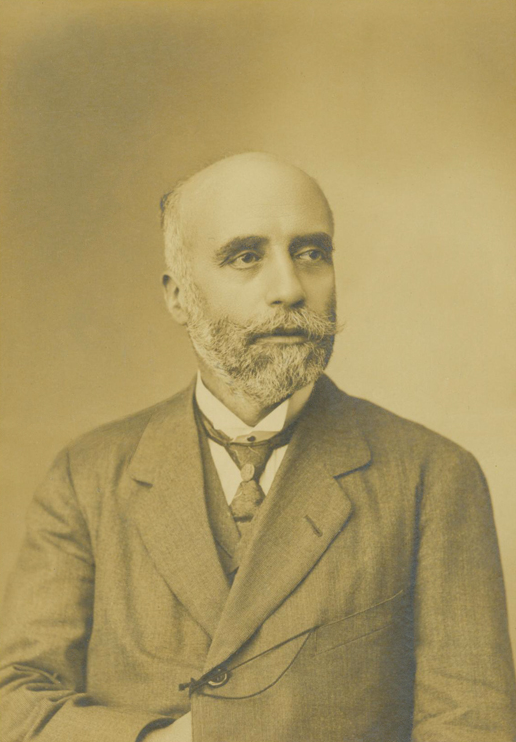
- José Leite de Vasconcelos
- Born: 7 July 1858; Ucanha, Tarouca, Portugal
- Died: 17 May 1941 (aged 82); Lisbon, Portugal
- Occupations: Ethnographer, author
- Writing career
- Period: 1881–1941
- Genre: Academic publishing
- Subjects: Ethnography, popular culture

José Leite de Vasconcelos Cardoso Pereira de Melo (7 July 1858 – 17 May 1941), known as simply Leite de Vasconcelos, was a Portuguese ethnographer, archaeologist and prolific author who wrote extensively on Portuguese philology and prehistory. He was the founder and the first director of the Portuguese National Museum of Archaeology.

== Biography ==
From childhood, Leite de Vasconcelos was attentive to his surroundings, recording in small notebooks everything that interested him. At the age of 18 he went to Porto, where in 1881 he completed a degree in natural sciences and, in 1886, a second degree in medicine. However, he practiced as a physician for only one year, serving as a health care administrator in Cadaval during 1887.

=== Philological research ===
His 1886 thesis, Evolução da linguagem (Evolution of Language) demonstrated an early interest that would come to occupy all his long life. His scientific training had imparted a rigorous and exhaustive investigative discipline to his work, whether in philology, archaeology or ethnography. He began the journals Revista Lusitana (1889) and Arqueólogo Português (1895), and founded the Museu Etnológico de Belém in 1893.

At the University of Paris, he completed a doctoral thesis, Esquisse d'une dialectologie portugaise (1901), the first important compendium of Portuguese dialects (work that was later continued and advanced by Manuel de Paiva Boléo and Luís Lindley Cintra). He also pioneered the study of Portuguese names with the work Antroponímia Portuguesa and studied numismatics and Portuguese philology after his 1887 appointment as curator of the National Library in Lisbon. On the founding of the Faculty of Letters at the University of Lisbon in 1911, he was appointed professor of Latin and Medieval French.

=== The problem of Galician ===
Early in his career, Leite de Vasconcelos turned his attention to the Galician language. In 1902 he published an article ("Vozes galhegas") in the journal Revista Lusitana, based on a manuscript entered into the National Library of Madrid sometime after 1843. In his Esquisse d’une Dialectologie Portugaise he characterized Galician as a co-dialect of Portuguese: rather than having arisen from Portuguese, Galician had developed as a related but distinct branch of the same Galician-Portuguese trunk.

In 1910 Miuçalhas gallegas was published; drawing attention to various aspects of Galician studies, it contained a brief discourse on the linguistic boundary between Fala and Galician, corresponding to Ribadavia, Ferreiros and San Miguel de Lobios in Ourense, much of Hermisende and Zamora—although the last of these is, strictly speaking, a separated or transmontane Fala.

Leite was somewhat hasty in collecting his Galician data; in most cases he spent only one day on his visits to Galicia, a marked contrast to the diverse data he had amassed on other Galician-Portuguese dialects. Despite his enormous talent and immense capacity for scholarship, perhaps he spent too much time on his other research and writing to avoid pitfalls on his Galician work. At the dawn of the 20th century a golden opportunity was lost, therefore, of applying the scientific precision of historical linguistics, in the hands of an authentic philologist, to the analysis of the Galician language.

=== Leite's legacy ===
On his death at 82 he bequeathed to the Museu Nacional de Arqueologia his library of about 8,000 titles, as well as manuscripts, correspondence, engravings and photographs.

== Works ==
- O Dialecto Mirandez (1882)
- Tradições populares de Portugal (Popular traditions of Portugal, Ed. Livraria portuense De Clavel, Porto, 1882).
- Portugal Pré-histórico (Prehistoric Portugal, 1885)
- A Evolução da Linguagem (The Evolution of Language, dissertation, Oporto, 1886)
- Revista Lusitana (first series: 1887–1943; 39 volumes)
- Religiões da Lusitânia (Religions of Lusitania, 1897, 1905, 1913; three volumes)
- Estudos de Filologia Mirandesa (Philology of Miranda do Douro, 1900 and 1901; two volumes)
- Esquisse d’une Dialectologie Portugaise (Sketch of Portuguese Dialectology, PhD dissertation, Paris, 1901)
- Textos Archaicos (anthology, 1903)
- Livro de Esopo (1906)
- O Doutor Storck and A Litteratura Portuguesa (1910)
- Lições de Philologia Portuguesa (1911)
- História do Museu Etnológico Português (History of Portuguese Ethnological Museum, 1915)
- Signum Salomonis (Solomon's Seal, 1918)
- De Terra em Terra (From Land to Land, anthology)
- De Campolide a Melrose (From Campolide to Melrose)
- Mês de Sonho (Dream Month, a visit to the Azores, 1924)
- A barba em Portugal (The Beard in Portugal, 1925)
- A figa (The Gesture of Contempt, 1926)
- Antroponímia Portuguesa (Portuguese Names, 1928)
- Opúsculos (1928, 1928, 1929, 1931 and 1988; five volumes)
- Etnografia Portuguesa (Portuguese Ethnography, 1933–1988, ten volumes)
- Filologia Barranquenha – apontamentos para o seu estudo (Philology of Barrancos, 1940, ed. 1955)
- Romanceiro Português (Portuguese Poems and Songs, ed. 1958–1960, two volumes)
- Contos Populares e Lendas (ed. 1964, two volumes)
- Teatro Popular Português (Portuguese Popular Theatre, ed. 1974–1979)

== See also ==
- National Archaeology Museum (Lisbon)
- List of Portuguese people
