= Praça do Império =

Empire Square
- City square
- Praça do Império
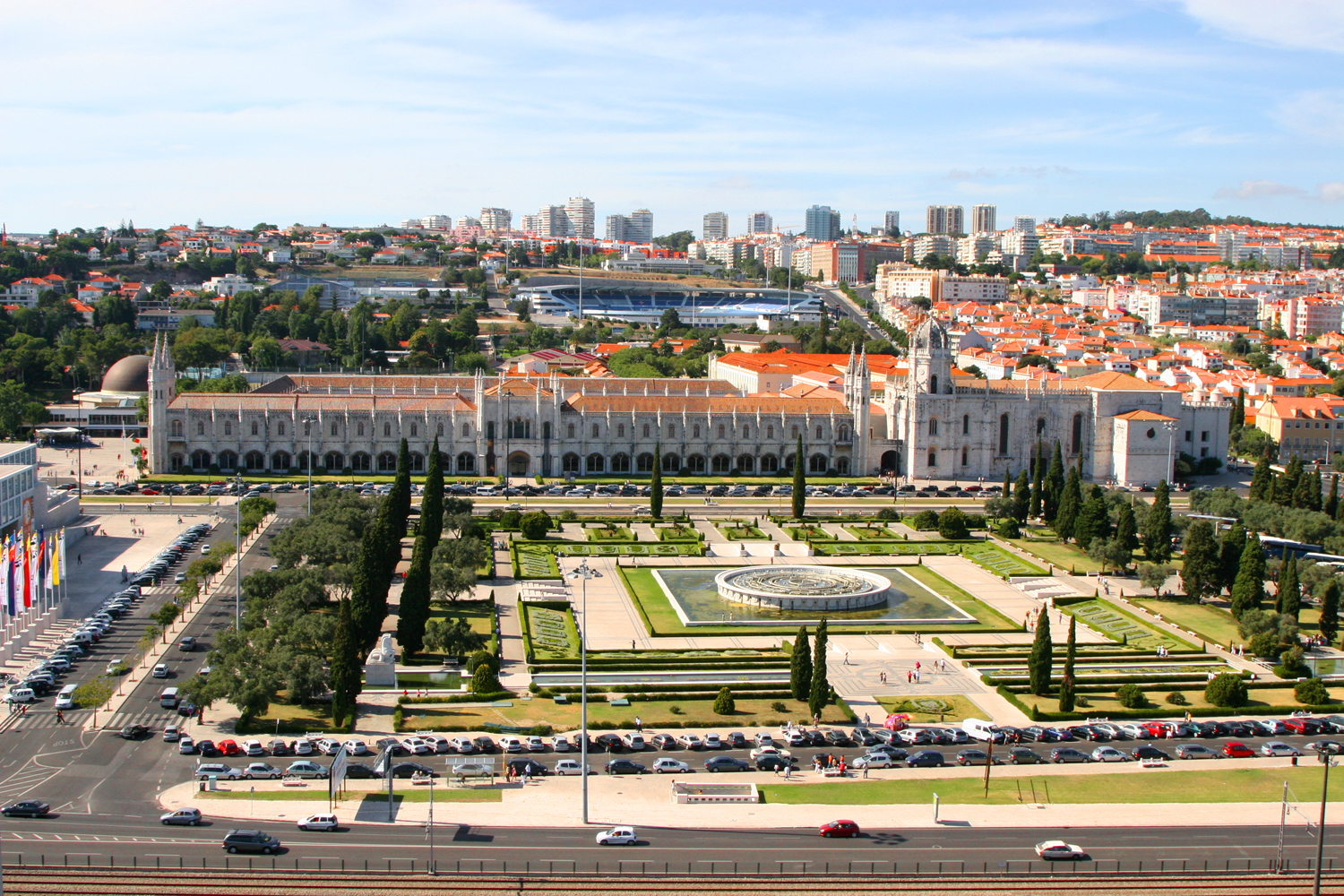
- View of the Praça do Império in front of the Monastery of the Jeronimos
- Opened: 20th century
- Named for: Portuguese Empire
- Manager: Instituto Gestão do Patrimonio Arquitectónico e Arqueológico
- Location: Lisbon, Portugal
- Location of the manorhouse within the municipality of Lisbon
- Coordinates: 38°41′45″N 9°12′22″W

The Praça do Império (Empire Square) is a city square and park situated adjacent to principal monuments and tourist attractions in the civil parish of Belém, municipality and Portuguese capital of Lisbon.

== History ==
Between 23 June and 2 December 1940, Lisbon realized the Exposição do Mundo Português (Portuguese World Exposition), that included an urbanization plan that encompassed the area of Belém, that included the Praça do Império. The sculptures of the seahorses, that dominate the site, were completed by sculptor António Duarte were installed in 1940.

A project to construct the Palácio do Ultramar (Overseas Palace) was initiated in 1952, situated on the eastern edge of the park, authored by architects Cristino da Silva and Jacques Carlu.

In 1973, a commemorative monument to the poet Augusto Gil (1873-1929) was installed on the site, that included a bronze medallion and inscription by the municipal council of Lisbon.

The roads around the square were used as a special stage in the 2011 to 2014 Rally de Portugal.

The formal operator of the square is Câmara Municipal de Lisboa local administration per Article III, 23 122, 11 October 1933.

It is included in the Special Protection Zone (ZPE) of the Monastery of Santa Maria de Belém (v. IPA.00006543).

== Architecture ==
The park is situated to the south of the Monastery of Santa Maria de Belém and west of the Centro Cultural de Belém.

The rectangular 175 by 175 metres (574 ft × 574 ft) square consists of successive quadrangles, that structure the space into passages and greenspaces. These converge in the central illuminated fountain on a square platform, covering an area of 3,300 square metres (36,000 ft^{2}). On the extreme edges of the southern part of the square, along the Avenida da Índia are hippocamp statues (seahorses), over reflecting pools.

== Gallery ==
The central fountain in operation, with coats of arms in relief around the basin

The anchor-shaped sundial, with the Monument to the Discoveries in the background

António Duarte’s hippocamp sculpture group in one of the garden ponds
