= Castros in Portugal =

A castro is a fortified settlement, usually pre-Roman, associated with the Celtic culture. These are frequently found in Portugal, usually in the North, but can also be found elsewhere. The word castro comes from the Latin castrum, which means "hill fort". The first Castros where just small residences with rudimentary stone walls.

== Northwestern Castro Network ==
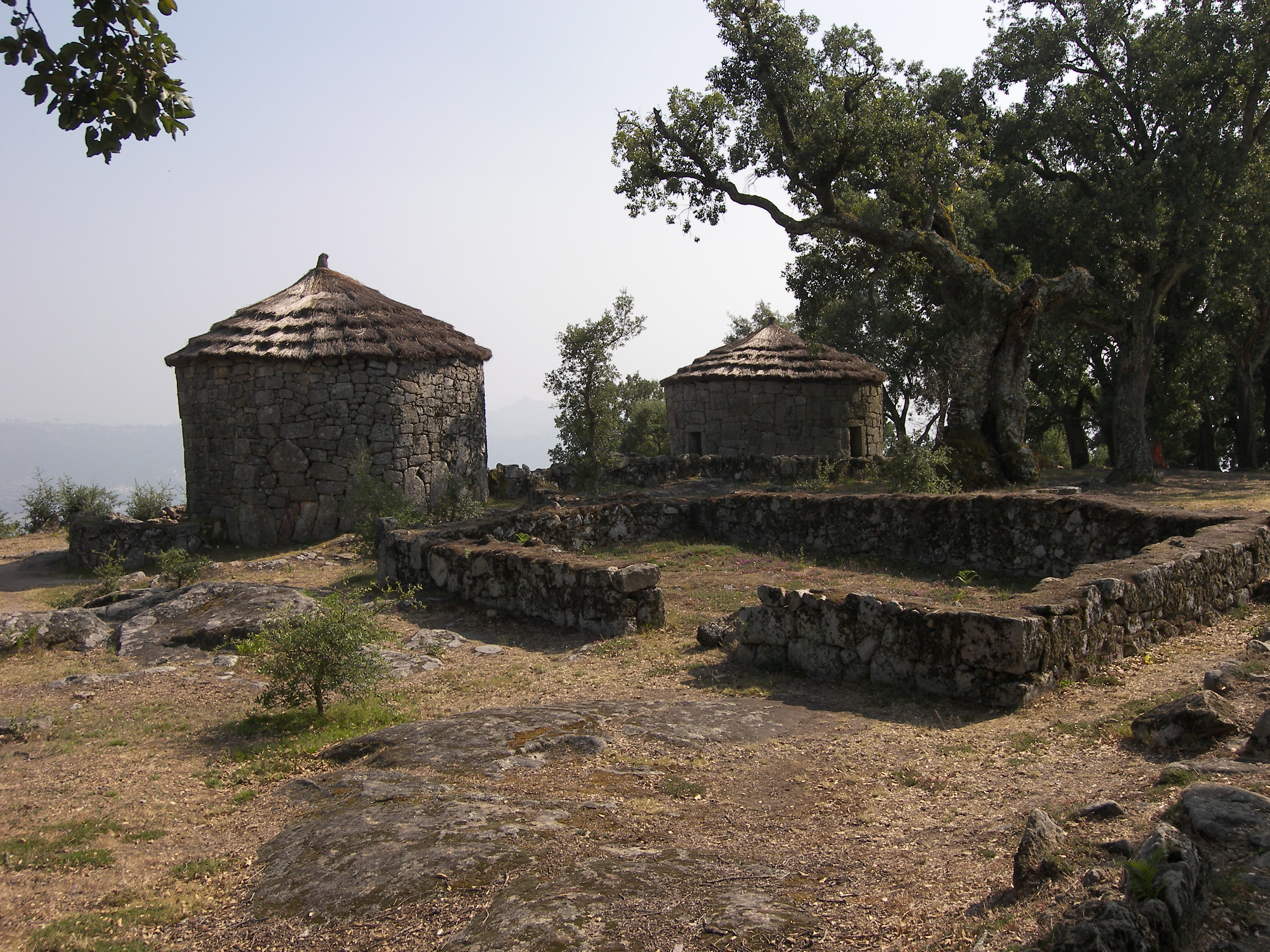
Castro houses reconstructed by Martins Sarmento at the Citânia de Briteiros

The Northwestern Castro Network (Rede de Castros do Noroeste), was established in 2015 grouping the most important sites in Northern Portugal as founding members out of 2,000 archaeological sites:

- Boticas (Castro do Lesenho);
- Esposende (São Lourenço);
- Monção (São Caetano);
- Paços de Ferreira (Sanfins);
- Penafiel (Monte Mozinho);
- Póvoa de Varzim (Cividade de Terroso);
- Santo Tirso (Castro do Padrão);
- Trofa (Alvarelhos);
- Vila do Conde (Bagunte);
- the Sociedade Martins Sarmento, from Guimarães (which manages Citânia de Briteiros);
- the Direcção Regional de Cultura, managing Citânia de Santa Lúzia in Viana do Castelo.

Despite its name, the network includes, for the time being, only Portuguese partners, and froze the idea to world heritage candidacy to UNESCO, given the disparities in archaeological research, and the necessity to create visitation and promotion conditions. This is especially true in the municipality of Vila do Conde, which holds Cividade de Bagunte, one of the largest sites, along with seven other castros. The Vila do Conde city hall managed to obtain its Cividade's land area only in 2015, after 60 years of negotiations and legal confrontation.

== Map of National Monument Castros in Portugal ==
Castros in Portugal (Portugal)

== Lists of Castros in Portugal ==
Name	Municipality	Region	Initial occupation period	Last occupation period
Citânia de Briteiros	Guimarães	North	Atlantic Bronze Age	High Middle Ages
Citânia de Sanfins	Paços de Ferreira	North	Iron Age	Middle Ages
Citânia de Santa Luzia	Viana do castelo	North	Iron Age	Modern
Cividade de Âncora	Caminha	North		
Cividade de Bagunte	Vila do Conde	North		
Cividade de Terroso	Póvoa de Varzim	North	Bronze Age	Classical antiquity
Castro de Alvarelhos	Trofa	North		
Castro de Castelo Velho	Alandroal	Alentejo	Chalcolithic	Early Middle Ages
Castro de Carmona	Barcelos	North		
Castro de Chibanes	Palmela	Lisboa	Chalcolithic	Early Middle Ages
Castro de Cidadelhe	Mesão Frio	North		
Castro da Cola	Ourique	Alentejo		
Castro de Eiras	Vila Nova de Famalicão	North		
Castro de Leceia	Oeiras	Lisboa	Final Neolithic	Chalcolithic
Castro de Monte Castelo	Matosinhos	North	Chalcolithic	
Castro de Monte Mozinho	Penafiel	North		
Castro de Monte Valinhas	Arouca	North		
Castro de Sacóias	Bragança	North		
Castro de São Julião	Vila Verde	North		
Castro de São Lourenço	Esposende	North		
Castro of Vieito	Viana do Castelo	North	Classical antiquity	Classical antiquity
Castro de Vila Nova de São Pedro	Azambuja	Alentejo	Chalcolithic	
Castro de Zambujal	Torres Vedras	Center	Chalcolithic	
Cabeço do Vouga	Águeda	Center	Iron Age	
Castro de Conímbriga	Condeixa-a-Nova	Center	Bronze Age	Early Middle Ages
Castle of Geraldo	Évora	Alentejo	Bronze Age	Middle Ages
Outeiro de Baiões	São Pedro do Sul	Center		
Outeiro de Cárcoda	São Pedro do Sul	Center		
Outeiro Carvalhelhos	Boticas	North		
Outeiro Lesenho	Boticas	North		
Outeiro do Pópulo	Alijó	North		
Outeiro de Romariz	Santa Maria da Feira	North		

== See also ==
- History of Portugal
- Prehistoric Iberia
- Castros in Spain
