= Bracari =

Ancient Celtic tribe

Map of Gallaecia at about 300 BCE, with the Bracari at the bottom left.

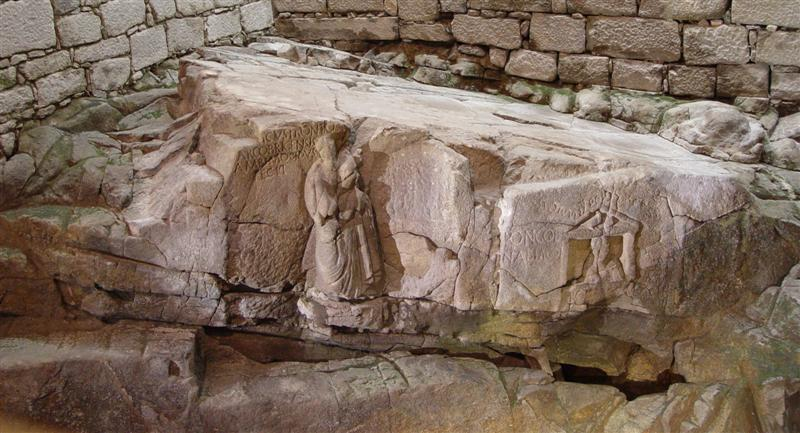
The Fonte do Ídolo, in Braga.

The Bracari or Callaeci Bracari were an ancient Celtic tribe of Gallaecia, living in the northwest of modern Portugal, in the province of Minho, between the rivers Tâmega and Cávado. After the conquest of the region beginning in 136BC, the Romans established the Augustan citadel of Bracara, modern Braga, in 20 BC.

Neighbouring this people or tribe, to the south were the Gallaeci Proper or Callaeci (that gave the name to the larger tribal confederation of the same name - the Gallaeci) and the Narbasi, to the north were the Luanci, Nebisoci and Seurbi, to the east were the Nemetati and the Lubaini, to the west were the Atlantic coast. It is possible that the Celtic Nemetati were an allied tribe of the Bracari.

Appian wrote they were a very warlike people. According to him, The Bracari women warriors fought defending their town "never turning, never showing their backs or uttering a cry."

It has long been known that they spoke a Celtic language, as can be seen in the inscription dedicated to the goddess Nabia at Braga's Fonte do Ídolo (Portuguese for the Fountain of the Idol), or in the name of their town Tongobriga (in Marco de Canaveses).

The region was home to some native and notable citadels that fiercely resisted Roman rule and were besieged by the Romans. These were Lambriaca, Avobriga, and Cinania. Lambriaca and Avobriga were located near the coast, probably near the river mouth of the Ave river where some citadels ruins are known. At the beginning of the 1st century, the Citânia de Briteiros was one of their main citadels and seat of the "consilium gentis". Cividade de Terroso, near the Ave river mouth, shows archaeological signs of the Roman siege and conquest.

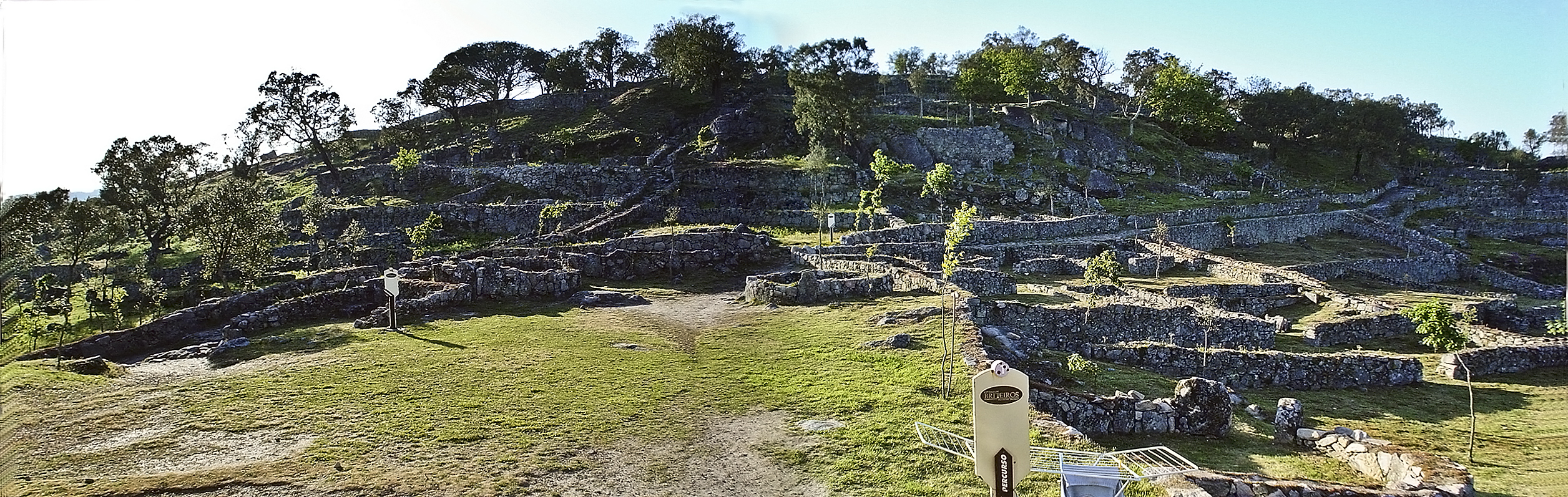
Panoramic of Citânia de Briteiros

It was suggested that Citânia de Briteiros could be ancient Cinania. However, this is not certain, as there were other citadels nearby, including Citânia de Sanfins. It is known that Cinania had luxuries and an iron ore mine, used for a surprise attack on the Roman camp.

The goddess Nabia was very popular in the territory of the Callaici Bracari with several inscriptions, like the one at Braga's Fonte do Ídolo (Portuguese for Fountain of the Idol).

== See also ==
- Castro culture
- Citânia de Briteiros
- Citânia de Sanfins
- Nemetati
- Pre-Roman peoples of the Iberian Peninsula
