= Cividade de Âncora =

Archaeological site in Viana do Castelo, Portugal

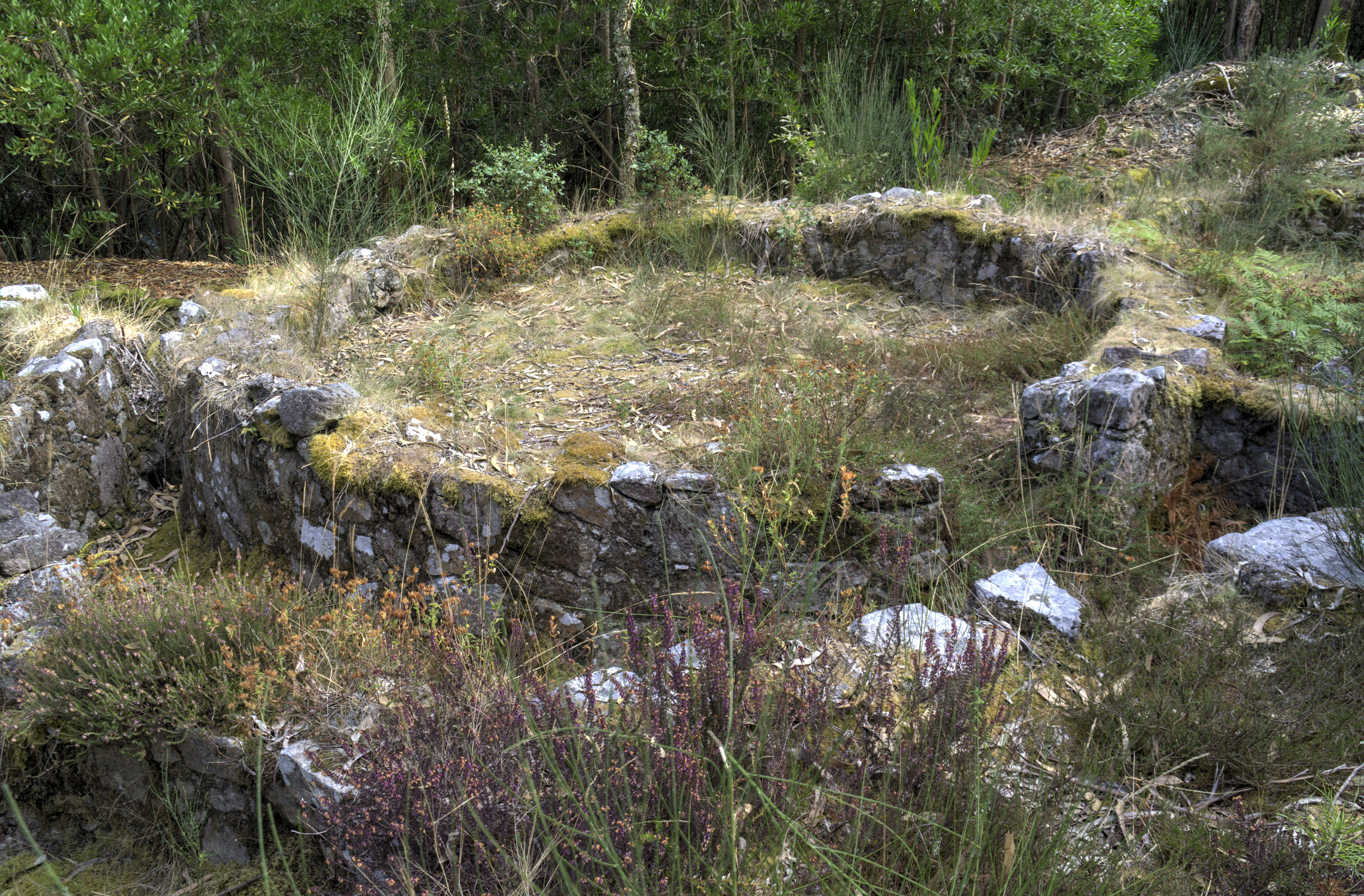
- Interactive map of the Cividade de Âncora area

General information
- Type: Castro
- Architectural style: Chalcolithic
- Location: Âncora (Caminha), Afife, Portugal
- Coordinates: 41°47′31.4″N 8°51′4.5″W
- Owner: Private

The Cividade de Âncora (also known as Cividade de Afife) is an archaeological site of the Castro culture located in Afife and Âncora, at the border of the municipalities of Viana do Castelo and Caminha. The Cividade was built during the Iron Age (2nd Century BCE) and was occupied up to the Romanization of Hispania (1st Century CE). Despite no evidence of occupation after the Roman period, two Stelae belonging to the Middle Ages were found in the area. The Cividade was first dug in 1880 by Francisco Martins Sarmento and the last intervention was in 2013. The Cividade de Âncora is an unclassified monument, being in the process of classification since 2018. Its findings can be seen in Caminha and Viana do Castelo's municipal museum.

== Architecture ==
The Cividade was built on the Monte da Suavidade ("Hill of Softness"), overseeing the Âncora River. The hill has a maximum height of 187 metres (614 ft) and is 1,250 metres (4,100 ft) from the sea. Along with other smaller settlements, it controlled the access to tin and gold in the mountain ranges of Santa Luzia and Arga.

It is protected by three lines of stone walls, with an average width of 1.5 metres (4.9 ft). The Cividade's cemetery was located within the residential section of the Cividade. The houses were of circular and oval shape, made of stone walls and ceilings of perishable materials. The houses were typically arranged around a central patio with a cistern or fountain.

== See also ==
- Citânia de Briteiros
- Castros in Portugal
- History of Portugal
