= Citânia de Santa Luzia =

Archaeological site in Paços de Ferreira, Portugal

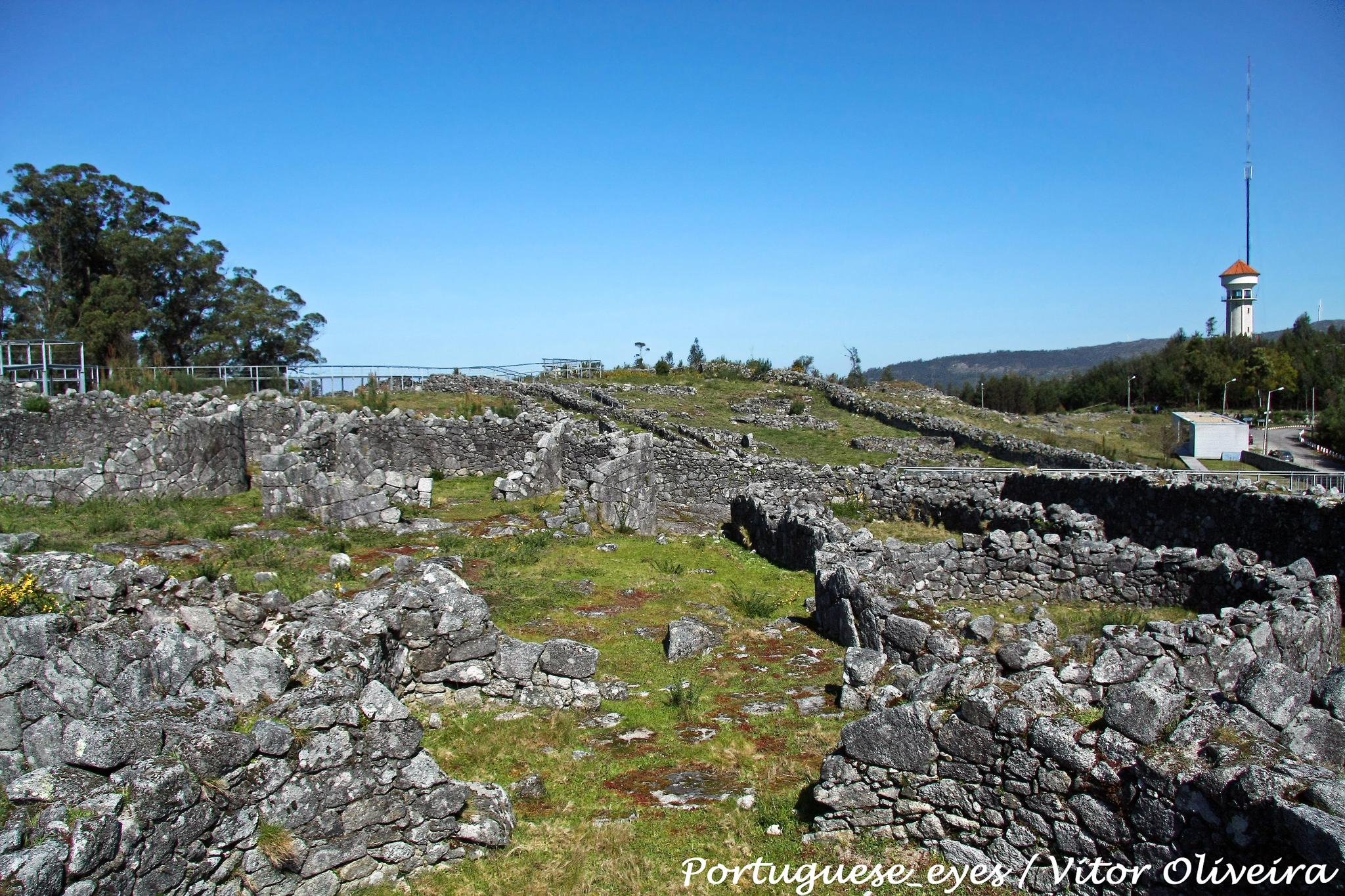
- View of Citânia of Santa Luzia, showing house ruins
- Interactive map of the Citânia de Santa Luzia area

General information
- Type: Castro
- Architectural style: Chalcolithic
- Location: Areosa, Viana do Castelo, Portugal
- Coordinates: 41°42′17″N 8°50′7″W
- Owner: Portuguese Republic

The Citânia de Santa Luzia (also known as the Old City of Santa Luzia) is an archaeological site of the Castro culture located in the Portuguese civil parish of Areosa in the municipality of Viana do Castelo. Its construction dates from the Iron Age, and it shows evidence of occupation during the Roman period. The Castro was first dug in 1876 by Joaquim Possidonio Narciso da Silva. Only about one third of the structures have been dug, with the remaining part being under or destroyed during the construction of the nearby hotel (1900 - c. 1910), church (1904 - 1943), and respective roads. The site also included a possibly medieval chapel dedicated to Saint Lucy which persisted, after some reconstructions, until 1926 when it was destroyed to give way to the Saint Lucy Church of Miguel Ventura Terra.

== Architecture ==
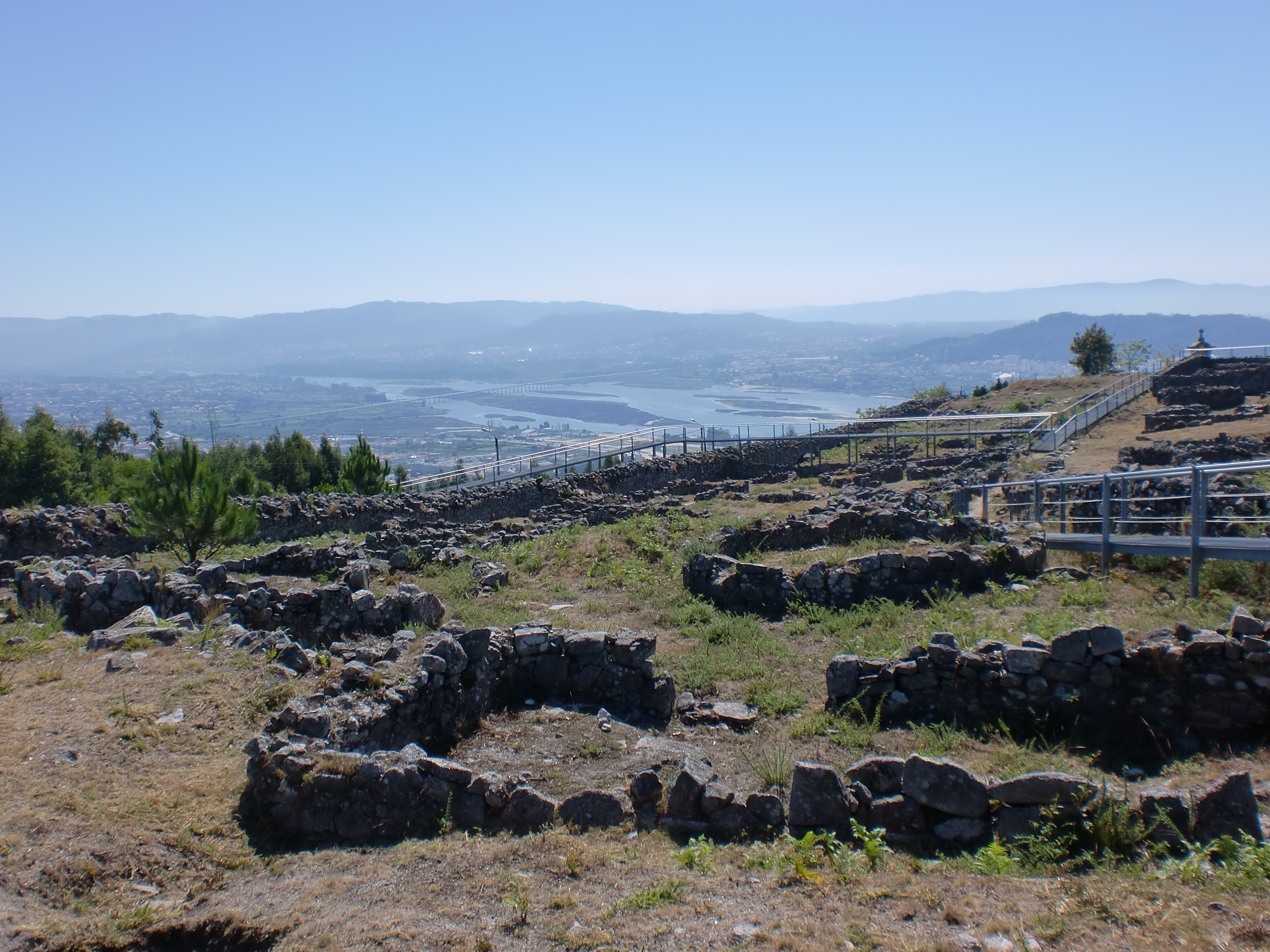
View of Viana do Castelo from the Citânia

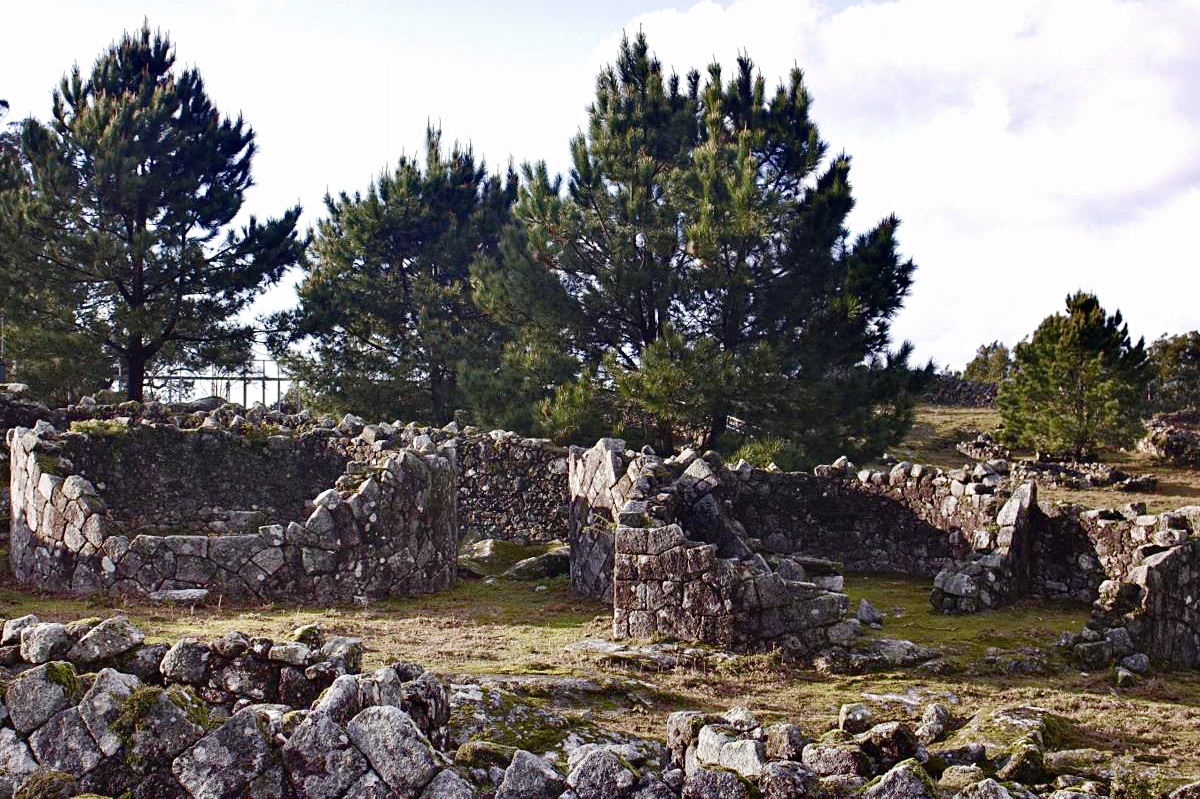
Citânia St Luzia, Viana Portugal

The Citânia was constructed on the top of the Santa Luzia hill, overseeing the Lima River's delta and is protected by three lines of walls, towers, and two moats. The innermost walls (1.20 to 1.25 in thickness) enclose a 30m by 20m area that contains a single circular house and its only entrance faces West.

Ruins of approximately 74 houses have been found.

Most of them have circular foundations or elliptical, and few are rectangular. The houses are found within small, walled neighborhoods.

== Findings ==
The findings of the Citânia de Santa Luzia include multiple ceramics of the Castro, Roman, and Visigothic eras.

== See also ==
- Citânia de Briteiros
- Castros in Portugal
- History of Portugal
