= Gallaeci (tribe) =

Ancient Celtic tribe of Gallaecia

Map of Gallaecia with the Gallaeci at the middle bottom.

The Gallaeci or Callaeci were an ancient Celtic tribe of Gallaecia, living in the modern region of Galicia and Northern Portugal.

== Etymology ==
The Greek name of the tribe was Kallaikoi.

A large tribal confederation (the Gallaeci) in the northwest of the Iberian Peninsula and the region of Gallaecia (roughly today's Galicia and Northern Portugal, and also included Asturias and part of León) are named after the Gallaeci.

== Culture ==
Culturally, the Gallaeci were part of the Late Bronze Age and Iron Age Castro Culture.

== Geography ==
Neighbouring this tribe to the north were the Bracari and the Narbasi, to the northeast the Narbasi and some of the Nemetati, and to the east (low valley of the Tâmega river) were the Tongobrigenses, all of which were also Gallaecian tribes.

To the south (south of the Douro river) were the Turduli Veteres, a tribe part of the Turduli, and to their southeast (south of the Douro) were the Paesuri, a tribe part of the Lusitanians and to their west was the Atlantic coast.

Their territory was in a strategic position at the low course of the Douro river, because land and maritime routes, including trade routes, crossed their territory between the north and the south or vice versa, and from the east to the west or vice versa.

== Roman conquering ==
Roman general Decimus Junius Brutus Callaicus conquered their land and founded the Roman city Portus Cale (today's Porto, Portugal) in approximately 136 BC based on or close to an older Celtic village and fortress (a Castro) that was on the top of a hill on the north bank of the Douro, close to its mouth but more to the inland.

The place name Portus Cale would later give rise to the name Portugal (the country).

== See also ==
- Pre-Roman peoples of the Iberian Peninsula
