= Briteiros São Salvador e Briteiros Santa Leocádia =

- Civil parish
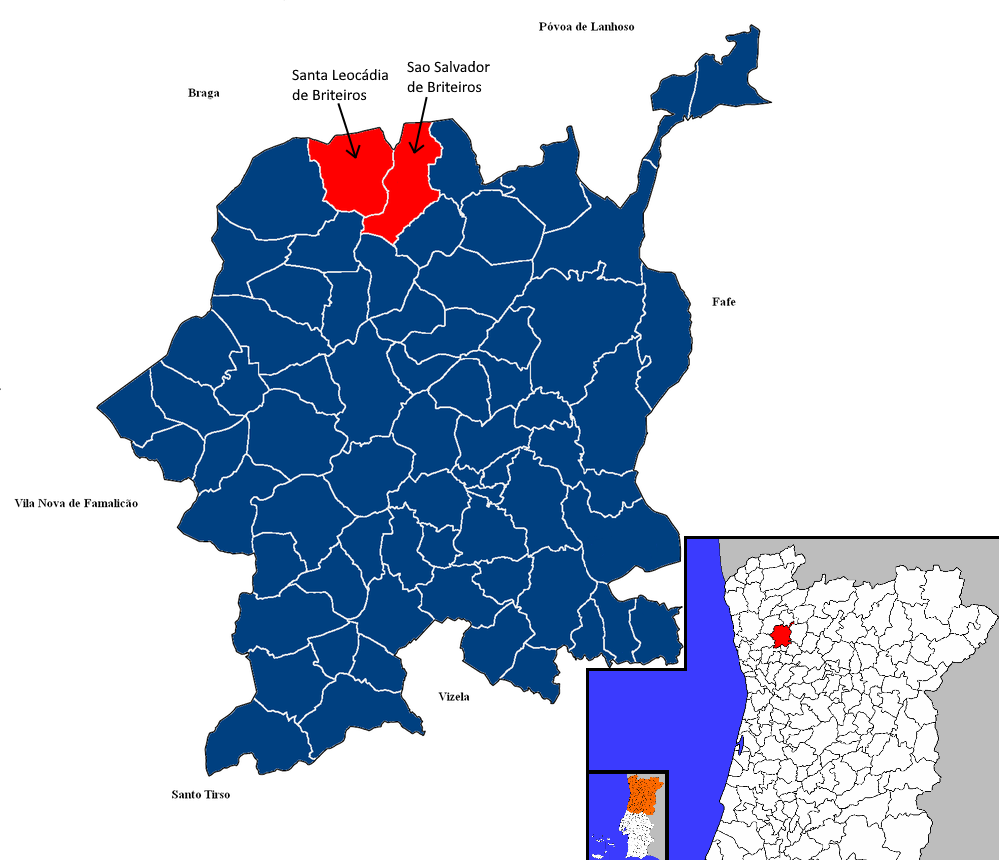
- Coordinates: 41.522°N 8.327°W
- Country: Portugal
- Region: Norte
- Intermunic. comm.: Ave
- District: Braga
- Municipality: Guimarães

Area
  - Total: 9.39 km^{2} (3.63 sq mi)

Population (2021)
  - Total: 1,687
  - Density: 180/km^{2} (470/sq mi)
- Time zone: UTC+00:00 (WET)
  - Summer (DST): UTC+01:00 (WEST)

Briteiros São Salvador e Briteiros Santa Leocádia (officially: União das Freguesias de Briteiros São Salvador e Briteiros Santa Leocádia) is a civil parish in the municipality of Guimarães, Portugal. It was formed in 2013 by the merger of the former parishes São Salvador de Briteiros and Santa Leocádia de Briteiros. The population in 2021 was 1,687, in an area of 9.39 km^{2}.

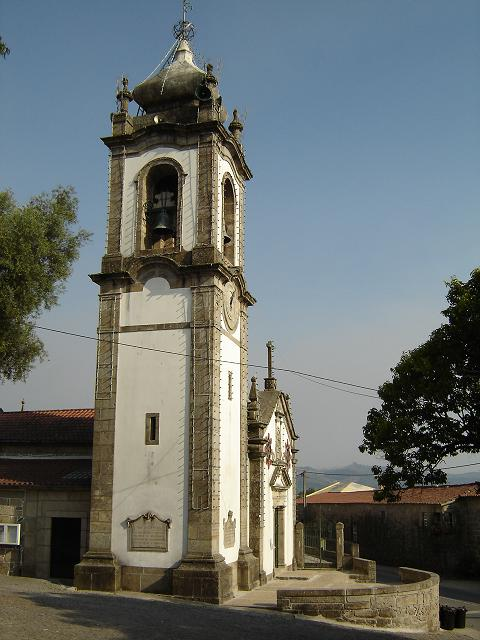
Salvador de Briteiros Church

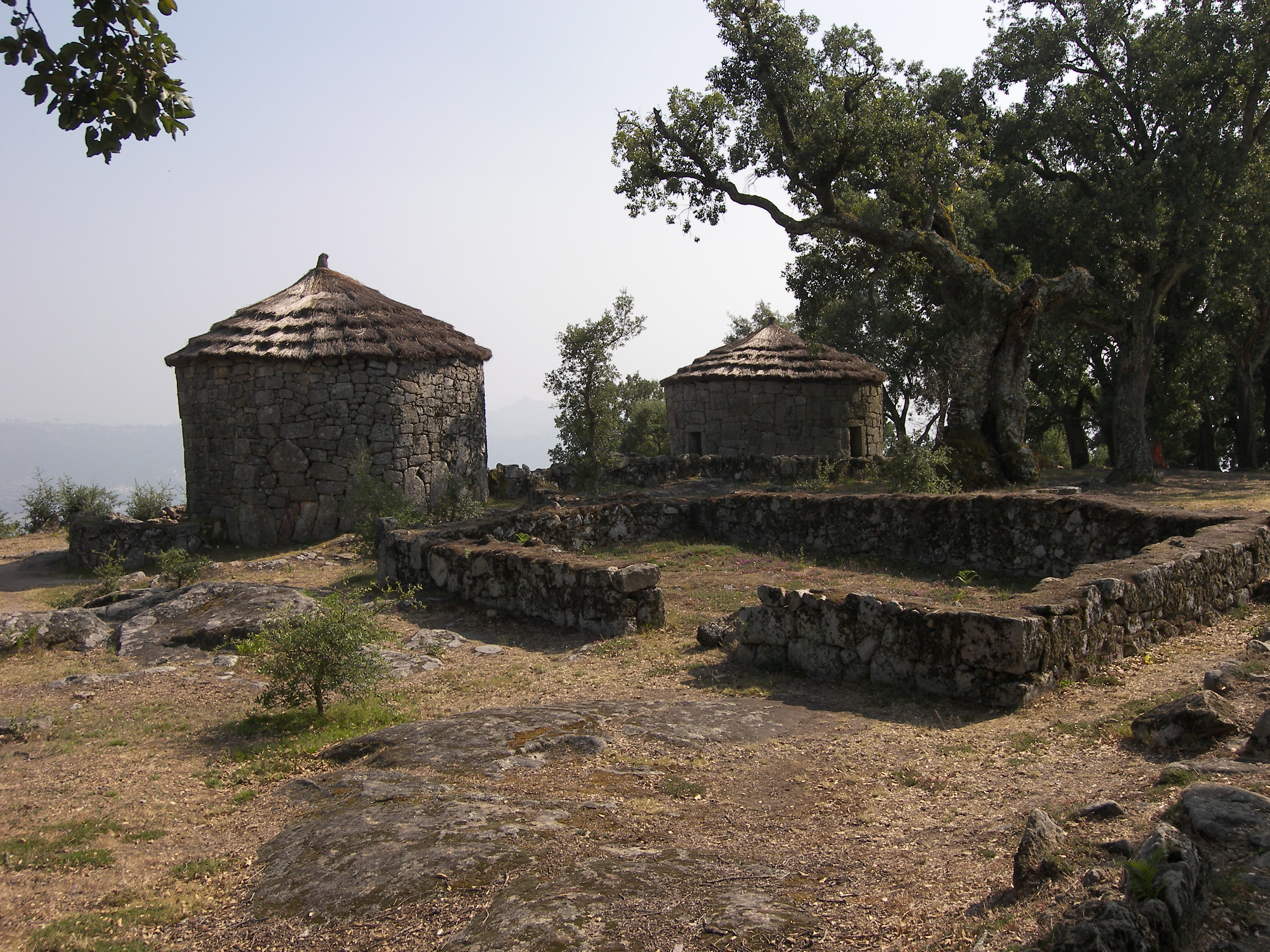
Citânia de Briteiros
