= Mamoa da Eireira =

Prehistoric dolmen in Viana do Castelo, Portugal

- Mamoa de Afife
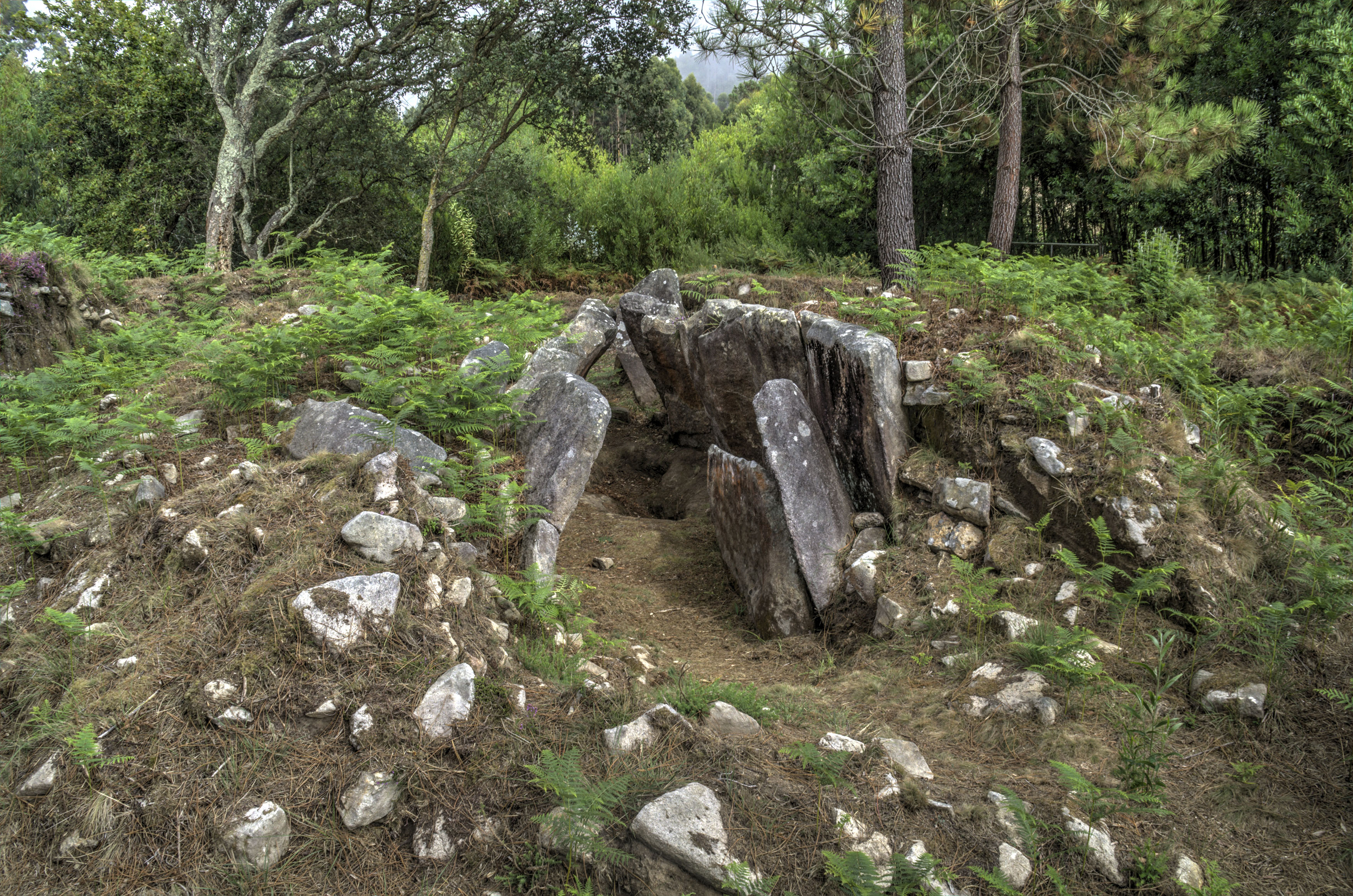
- Interactive map of Mamoa da Eireira
- 41°47′33.7″N 8°52′02.3″W
- Type: Dolmen
- Periods: Neolithic, re-used in the Chalcolithic
- Location: Afife, Viana do Castelo Municipality, northern Portugal

Site notes
- Height: 1.8 m (5.9 ft)
- Diameter: 28 m (92 ft)
- Excavation dates: 1986–1989; 2013–14
- Discovered: c. 1882
- Condition: Good but covered by vegetation
- Public access: Yes, with difficulty

The Mamoa da Eireira is a megalithic dolmen, or burial tomb, situated close to the Atlantic Ocean coast at an altitude of 30 metres, in the parish of Afife, within the Viana do Castelo Municipality in the north of Portugal. Rock paintings have been discovered at the site. The dolmen is unusual because of its "V" shape, with no clear division between the entrance and the burial chamber and with the orthostats being the same height in both.

== Location and history ==
The monument is located on the northwest slope of the Serra de Santa Luzia, about 400 m east of the coastline and in the vicinity of the Afife floodplain to its south, which is traversed by the Afife river. It dates from the 5th millennium BC (Middle Neolithic) with subsequent usage until the 3rd millennium BC (Chalcolithic).

== Description ==
The word mamoa is used in the northwest of the Iberian Peninsula to refer to dolmens, which are more commonly known as antas elsewhere in Portugal. The Mamoa da Eireira is one of the best-preserved dolmens in the area, being composed of 16 granite orthostats of similar height, mainly inclined inwards, which are placed in a V shape, oriented east–west. The capstone has been displaced from its original position but is still on the site. The shape of the dolmen differentiates it from most other dolmens in Portugal, which have a pronounced corridor of smaller stones that lead to the burial chamber. The Mamoa da Eireira was originally covered by a tumulus with a diameter of 28 metres, much of which can still be seen.

== Excavations and findings ==
The Mamoa da Eireira was first referred to by Francisco Martins Sarmento in 1882 and by Émile Cartailhac in 1886. There were four excavations in the 1980s by Eduardo Jorge Lopes da Silva, some in collaboration with the National Archaeological Institute of Aquitaine in France, but the complete results were never published. Some further work was done in 2013–14 by Fábio Soares. Ten engraved stones have been found, largely with zigzag or serpentine patterns, the purpose of which has not been identified. One or two contain what Soares considered to have been "anthropomorphic figures". One of the orthostats, which also contains red pigment, can be seen at the Casa dos Nichos in Viana do Castelo, which also exhibits some of the other findings, including flint, quartz, and schist arrowheads, flint blades, polished stone axes, and a large number of quartzite flakes and shaped pebbles. Many of these were found in one small recessed area near the entrance, which it was assumed was used for an individual burial.

== Access ==
Despite its importance, it was difficult to reach the dolmen in 2026. There are no signposts and the track that connects with the nearby road can be hard to find. The surrounding area is home to many plant species, including fast-growing ferns and gorse and the dolmen can become overgrown and hard to see. The plaque at the site can also easily become obscured by vegetation.
