= Nemetati =

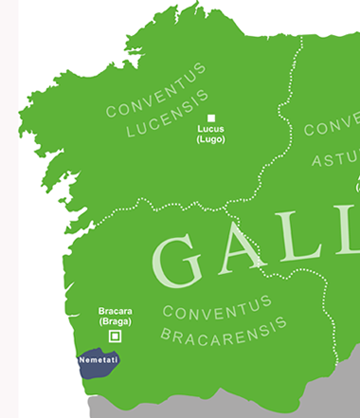
Map of Gallaecia

The Nemetati were an ancient Celtic tribe of Gallaecia, living in the north of modern Portugal between the Cávado and Ave River valley, in the province of Minho, north of the Douro.

They are known because of a mention in Claudius Ptolemy's Geography II, 6. 41, where they are mentioned as part of the Bracarenses group

Their ethnic name comes from the Celtic nemeton (Νεμετατῶν, Ptol. 2,6,40. Celtic, to nemeto- ato-), a place belonging to the sacred site/grove (to nemeto-), or more likely, place belonging to Nemetos.

The Citânia de Sanfins (in Paços de Ferreira) could be their main hill fort and the tribe may have some link with inscriptions to the war god Cosus Nemedecus.

== See also ==
- Castro culture
- Pre-Roman peoples of the Iberian Peninsula
