= Afife =

- Civil parish
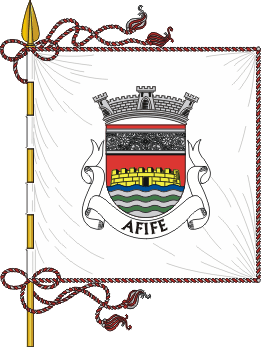
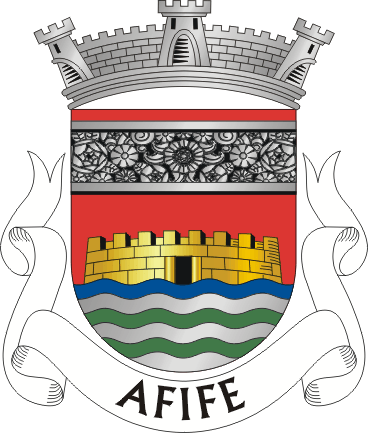
- Flag Coat of arms

- Location in Portugal
- Coordinates: 41.779°N 8.861°W
- Country: Portugal
- Region: Norte
- Intermunic. comm.: Alto Minho
- District: Viana do Castelo
- Municipality: Viana do Castelo

Area
  - Total: 13.03 km^{2} (5.03 sq mi)

Population (2011)
  - Total: 1,632
  - Density: 125.2/km^{2} (324.4/sq mi)
- Time zone: UTC+00:00 (WET)
  - Summer (DST): UTC+01:00 (WEST)
- Postal code: 4900
- Patron: Santa Cristina
- Website: http://www.jf-afife.com

Afife is a civil parish located in the Portuguese municipality of Viana do Castelo. The population in 2011 was 1,632, in an area of 13.03 km^{2}.

== History ==
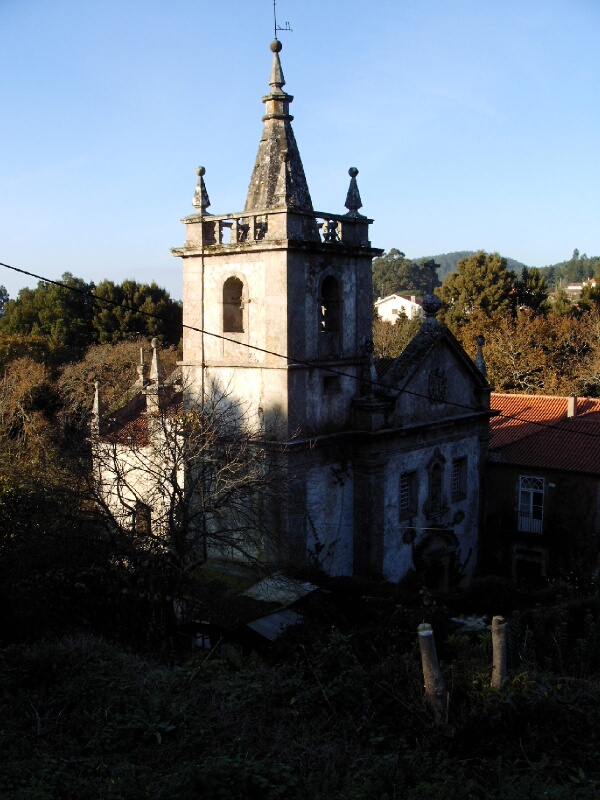
The old church of the Convent of São João de Cabanas

The date of the parish's founding is unclear, although archaeological evidence in this area (Castros, Dolmens, Cromlechs and Menhirs) attest to a human presence to the Neolithic. A notable dolmen is the Mamoa da Eireira, which is unusual because of its "V" shape, with no clear division between the entrance and the burial chamber, unlike most other dolmens in Portugal. Of the castro structures still located within the region, two share some importance: the castro Morro dos Mouros, and Cividade, which was located in a high mountaintop and separated the settlements of Afife from Âncora (in the neighbouring municipality of Caminha). The latter was a strongly defended fortification with thick walls, which today only exist remnants. Closer to the sea, is the Castro of Santo António, so called due to the existence of a chapel there dedicated to Saint Anthony of Padua, and which extends atop a small mountain. in the southeast. In addition, there is the castro of Cutro, where the vestiges of access road were discovered and two others in Agrichouso, in addition to several throughout the mountains. Similarly a Roman-era villa, in Baganheiras, burial mounds in Modorro and possibly in Concheiro, several funerary vases, and rock remnants of salting vats, as well as agricultural implements, indicate the presence of humans during the civilized periods of historical occupation.

Celts and Phoenician traders may have settled in this region, along the coast, although these are only speculations. The resettlement of Afife, began with the Count of Tui, D. Paio Vermundes, or his sons, when the lands between the Minho and Lima Rivers were under his domain. Documents from the 10th century, identifying several settlements along the coast and suggesting an occupation after 868, but before 890. It is unclear whether at this time the region was referred to as Fifi or Afifi (nomenclatures which first appeared at the end of the 9th century), or if it received this name from its founder or principal resident. It is possible that Afife arises from the Arab word "Afif", which is an adjective designating that someone is virtuous; much later, the name appeared in 1108, suggesting the existence of a Villa Afif, that obtained the name from its master. Along the centuries, the toponymy appeared variously as Fifi, Affifi, Afifi and Afife. Popular interpretations suggest that the place-name is Roman, from "Aff-hifas", indicating "sopa de cabelos" (hair soup). These definitions come from a period when Roman legions invaded the Lusitanian territory, massacring the population, including women. In order to escape the horrors, some of these women disfigured themselves, cutting their hair and throwing the tresses into springs. When thirsty soldiers went to one of these fountains, they discovered a hair in the water, referring to the area as soup of hair.

Title of Afife was held in the hands of Mendo Pais (one of the sons of the Count of Tui) and, later, one of his nephews, Paio Soares, before being transferred to the Monastery of São Salvador da Torre (at its foundation). The subsequent fate of the holdings of the monastery are not concrete, since the monastery went into ruins and its possessions were appropriated by others around the 10th century, and after the Moorish invasions of Almançor. The monastery was rebuilt after the 11th century, by the descendant of Paio Vermundes, presbyter Ordonho Enes.

The founding of the Monastery of São João de Cabanas occurred in the middle of the 6th century. Friar Leão de São Tomaz, a Benedictine monk, who lived during the era of Martin of Braga, suggested that this monastery located in the territory of Afife was established by the cleric. Some historians suggest that these declarations were premature, noting the construction of the monastery around 564, while other documents suggest 602. A century later, the monastery was a rich centre of religion in the region: "...all the lands of the mount of Âncora and waters to the river until the sea, and in addition to the river, also called Âncora, to the east which included three miles of land, and another three to the west, which had tithes, covenants and rents." The founder of the monastery left the institution in a favourable condition, lasting the reigns of Sebastian and Philip I, acting as a religious centre for convalescence and aid of the sick. But, judicial actions by powerful peoples, suggest that this institution followed the Order of Christ.

The 1258 Inquirições (Inqueries) confirm most of these facts, and also describe the existence of two villages in the parrochia Sancte Christine de Affifi, Affifi and Vila Meiãa, and several houses associated with the Monastery of São Salvador da Torre. During this epoch, the two villages and parish church were owned partially by the Crown, but the creation of the municipality of Viana do Castelo would change this. King Afonso III of Portugal approached the Bishop of Tui to abrogate his authority over the parish of Couto de Vinha in this new restructuring, but finding no support, the monarch transferred the royal lands of Afife and Vila Meã to Viana do Castelo. Similarly, the Sé of Braga also possessed lands within the region. At the time of the Royal inventory, the monastery of São João de Cabanas was controlled by the Royal court, and King Sancho I (in 1187).

Father Carvalho, around this time, listed Afife, in whole or in part, pertained to King Afonso III, granted half of this parish to the church of Santa Maria de Sá, in Ponte de Lima, in 1262, which pertained to the Episcopal seat of Tui, in exchange for patronage of Santa Maria da Vinha in Areosa. This was supported by documents in the possession of the Bishop of Tui, around 1258–1259, that situated the territory (within the territory of Entre Lima and Minho), as "medietas domini regis". King Denis later provided a tax in 1320, to elaborate the parish, situating the parish of Santa Cristina de Afife within the Terra de Vinha.

In the census of Diogo de Sousa (1514–1532), which was used to specify the annual payments to the archdiocese by the 140 residents, Afife is mentioned as a place within the municipality of Viana. A similar census by friar Baltasar Limpo (1551–1581) noted that Santa Cristina de Afife was part of the Terra de Viana, which was partially owned by the clergy of the Monastery of São Salvador.

In the 16th century, Afife was a rectory of the convent of São Domingos de Viana, and under the military jurisdiction of the Order of Christ.

== Geography ==
Afife is located along the northern border of the municipality of Viana do Castelo, approximately 10 kilometres from the municipal seat. It is neighbours include the civil parish of Vila Praia de Âncora (municipality of Caminha) and Freixieiro de Soutelo (in the municipality of Viana do Castelo) to the north; the parish of Carreço, and a small area of the parish of Areosa, (within the municipality of Viana do Castelo) to the south; the parish of Outeiro to the east; and fronting the Atlantic Ocean in the west.

Situated between the ocean and Santa Luzia mountains, Afife is situated in an ecological landscape that includes white sand beaches, along its 4 miles (6.4 km) coast. The Cabanas River is the main tributary in the parish, whose source lies within the Santa Luzia Mountains, and crosses the parish (and village), while the Ribeira de Afife (and its three affluents: the Ribeira da Pedreira, Ribeira de Agrichousa and Ribeira do Fojo) complement the water sources.

The beaches of Afife are isolated by a large curtain of dunes, whose growth have recently necessitated measure to limit desertification.

On its banks is located on the Convent of Cabanas, founded in the 10th century, is the most important Monument of the parish.

== Economy ==
Historically, Afife was a place known for fish captures and, for a time, whaling. One of the few economic industries along the coast was the collection of seaweed, an industry controlled by a rigorous agreement between the participants. A job handled by women, the seaweed was transported to the dunes after collection, dried and then sold from large mounds to farmers.

The fertile lands, which have supported the majority of its citizens throughout the centuries, have been supported by several small parcels. Tourism, small industry and commerce are the primary industries in the region. Initially based on primary sector industries, the economy in this parish has benefited from its location along the Atlantic Ocean, and, over the last few decades, reoriented its economy. After the 18th century, decorative gesso became an important contribution to the local economy, supported by professional programs to teach the skill.

== Culture ==
Traditional festivals in the parish include: the festival of São João (held on 24 June); Santo António (13 June); and Nossa Senhora da Lapa (between 12 and 14 July).

Gastronomically, the parish is known for Robalo com algas, arroz doce de Afife, filhoses and sanguinha.

The main socio-cultural organizations include the Casino Afifense, ADA – Associação Desportiva Afifense, NAIAA – Núcleo Amador de Investigação Arqueológica de Afife, Ronda da Costa Verde and Grupo de Danças e Cantares de Afife, APCA – Associação de Protecção e Conservação do Ambiente.

The British watercolour painter Susanna Roope Dockery, who lived in Porto had a small cottage in Afife, which she used as a base for trips to paint rural scenes.
