= Castro de Leceia =

Archaeological site in Paços de Ferreira, Portugal

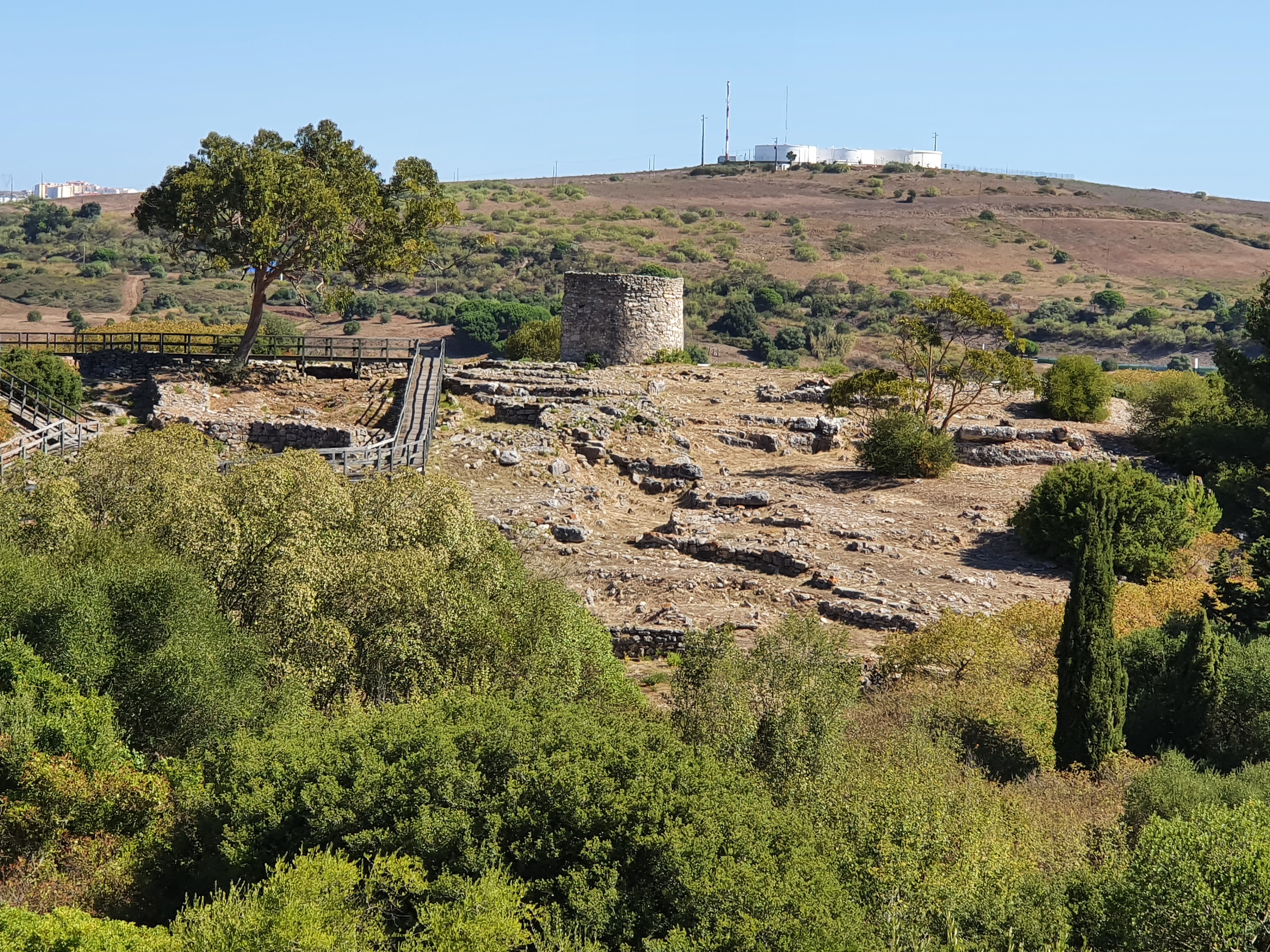
- View of the Castro de Leceia
- Interactive map of the Castro de Leceia area

General information
- Type: Castro
- Architectural style: Chalcolithic
- Location: Barcarena, Portugal
- Coordinates: 38°43′41″N 9°16′54″W
- Owner: Portuguese Republic

The Castro de Leceia or Leceia Eneolithic Station (Estação eneolítica de Leceia) is an archeological site of the Castro culture located in the Portuguese civil parish of Barcarena in the municipality of Oeiras. The area was first occupied during the end of the Neolithic (4th millennium BCE) and throughout the Chalcolithic, being abandoned somewhere between the end of the 4th and the beginning of the 3rd millennium BCE. The Castro was first dug and reported in 1878 by Carlos Ribeiro, who presented his results to the Lisbon Academy of Sciences in what may be considered the first monograph dedicated to a pre-historical Portuguese settlement. The last interventions date to 2003. The site is classified as a public interest monument (Imóvel de Interesse Público) since 1963.

== History ==
The area experienced four main occupation phases:

=== First phase (upper Neolithic) ===
During the first phase (upper Neolithic) more specifically between the end of 4th millennium BCE and beginning of the 3rd millennium BCE, circular houses were built without any extra defensive constructions. Since the beginning of its occupation, the inhabitants of the Castro are thought to have been strongly sedentary. Of all the ungulate remains found, swine (used for meat) were the most frequent, followed by bovine (meat, milk and as draft animals) and caprine species (meat, milk, and wool), with sheep being particularly frequent in this latter group. Given the frequency of each type of animal and each animals' meat yield, researchers think the main contributors of protein for the Neolithic inhabitants of Leceia were bovine, with hare and deer as a vestigial part of their diet.

=== Second phase (lower Chalcolithic) ===
During the second phase (lower Chalcolithic), thee lines of walls made of blocks of local limestone were rapidly built, covering a total of 11,000 square meters. This construction was done between 2900 and 2800 BCE, after a short abandonment of the area between the first and second phases, which probably did not exceed a few dozens of years. These walls had three entrances, protected by towards. During this phase, the caprine species become predominant due to a greater focus on secondary (i.e., non-meat) products such as wool and milk. The caprine species were then followed by swine and bovine species in terms of frequency. The main source of protein, in this phase, switches from bovine to swine species. The Equus genus is present in this phase, but in a reduced frequency and undomesticated. Hare and deer remain as a vestigial part of the population's diet. There are also multiple ceramic findings from this phase, belonging to a specific style typical of the Estremadurean lower Chalcolithic.

=== Third phase (middle Chalcolithic) ===
In a third phase the defensive structures are reinforced and the entrances are made narrower. During this period, the caprine species remain predominant and increase in frequency, being accompanied by the emergence of cheese molds and the increase in weaving-related ceramics. The conclusions regarding the remaining species are similar to the previous phase. A significant shift is observed in the ceramics, with the Estremadurean lower Chalcolithic style become vestigial and being replaced by the Estremadurean middle Chalcolithic style. It is also in this phase that the use of copper metallurgy becomes widespread and researchers consider this to be the height of the Castro's economic activity.

=== Fourth phase (upper Chalcolithic) ===
In the fourth phase the defensive structures are again reinforced and new, ellipsoidal houses are built, increasing the density of the constructions within the walls. Bell beakers have been found in two of these ellipsoidal houses.

=== Decline ===
At the end of the Chalcolithic (around 4th and the beginning of the 3rd millennium BCE), the Castro is abandoned. Some structures are dismantled or destroyed, but some construction is still done in this phase, with houses being built onto the defensive walls.

== Findings ==
There were many archeological findings in the Castro, for example:

- Tools such as axes, millstones, adzes, loom weights, copper fish hooks.
- Objects made of bone, such as beads and pins.
- Ceramics, namely bell beakers with acacia leaf decorations.
- Metal works, such as copper ingots and a copper axe.

Many of the findings are displayed in the Museu Nacional de Arqueologia and the Geological Museum of the Laboratório Nacional de Energia e Geologia. A permanent exhibition about the Castro de Leceia was created in the Fábrica da Pólvora de Barcarena, located two kilometers away from the Castro.

== See also ==
- Castro de Zambujal
- Castros in Portugal
- History of Portugal
