= Citânia de Sanfins =

Archaeological site in Paços de Ferreira, Portugal

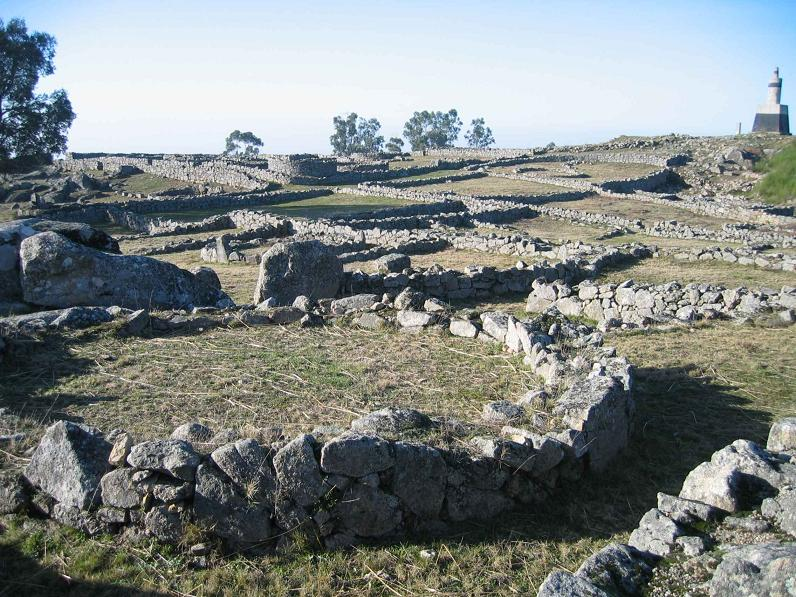
- View of Citânia of Sanfins, showing house ruins
- Interactive map of the Citânia de Sanfins area

General information
- Type: Castro
- Architectural style: Chalcolithic
- Location: Sanfins de Ferreira, Paços de Ferreira, Portugal
- Coordinates: 41°19′24″N 8°23′12″W
- Owner: Portuguese Republic

The Citância de Sanfins is an archaeological site of the Castro culture located in the Portuguese civil parish of Sanfins de Ferreira in the municipality of Paços de Ferreira. The construction of the Castro site developed over many phases, between the 5th century BCE and the 2nd century CE.

== Pedra formosa ==
The Pedra Formosa sauna, a building designed for the public baths, stands out for its construction technique and spectacular Celtic motifs crafted in stone. The Castro had a later period of Roman occupation that started during the 3rd Century CE, being abandoned during the 4th Century CE. The site also includes a chapel dedicated to Saint Romanus (c. 14th Century) and 34 graves belonging to a Christian cemetery from the Medieval age (c. 13th Century CE). The Castro was first dug in 1895 by Francisco Martins Sarmento e José Leite de Vasconcelos and the last interventions were in 1995, when one of the houses was reconstructed and a warrior statue replica was put near the entrance of the second wall.

== Architecture ==
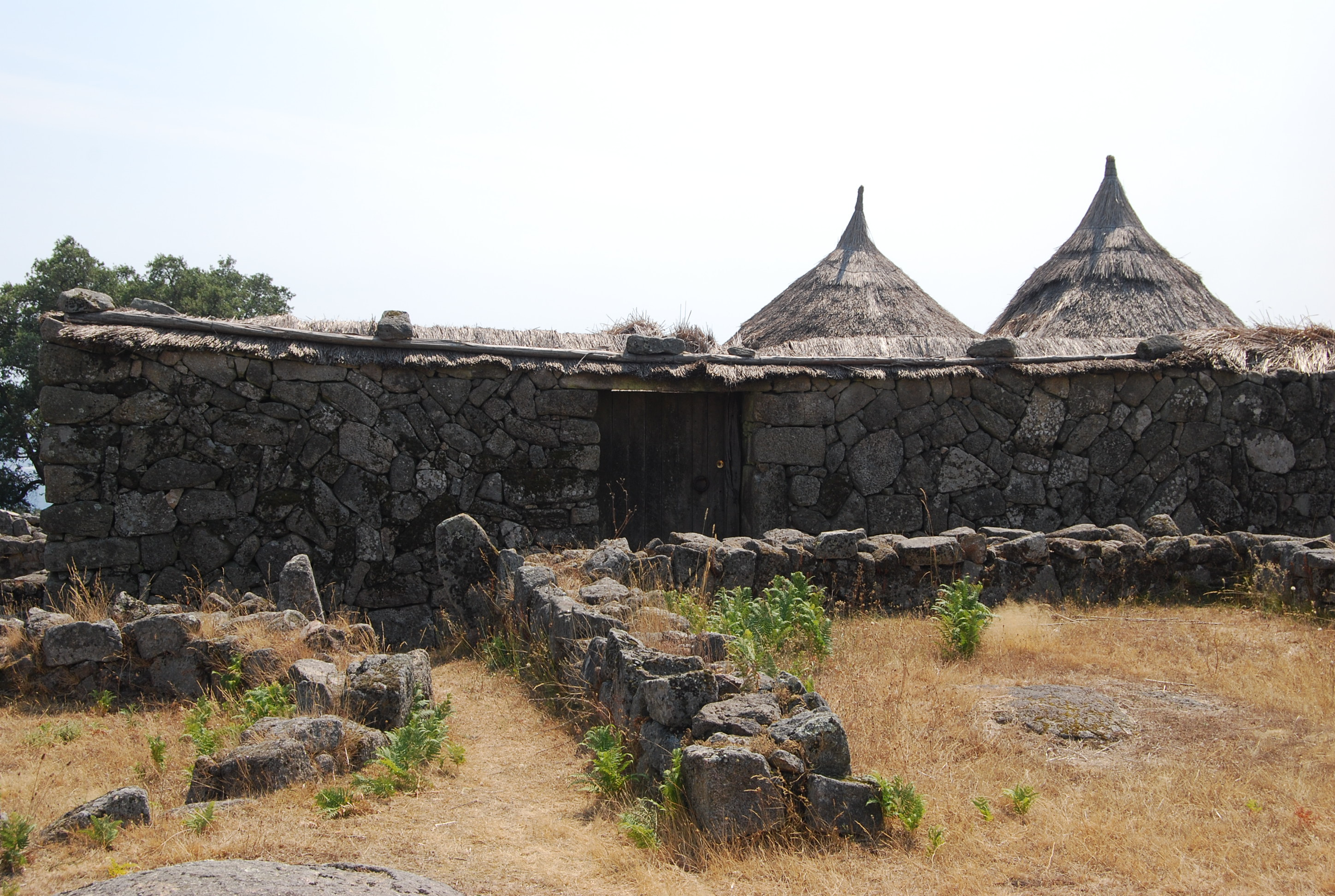
Reconstruction of a house in Sanfins

The Citânia was protected by three lines of walls, with an exterior wall protecting the West and South and a moat in the North and South. These walls were created using local granite blocks. About 160 houses have been found within the Citânia walls. Most of these houses are circular, with diameters of about 5m, granitic stone walls, and conic ceilings made of perishable materials. These houses typically form neighborhoods of 4 or 5 buildings, facing a common patio and surrounded by a wall, forming areas of 200-300m^{2}. On the periphery of the Citânia, a public bath building was found. Warrior statues were found in the Citânia, one of them overseeing the main entrance of the Citânia. The Citânia has a main road with a north–south orientation and collateral roads of east–west orientation.

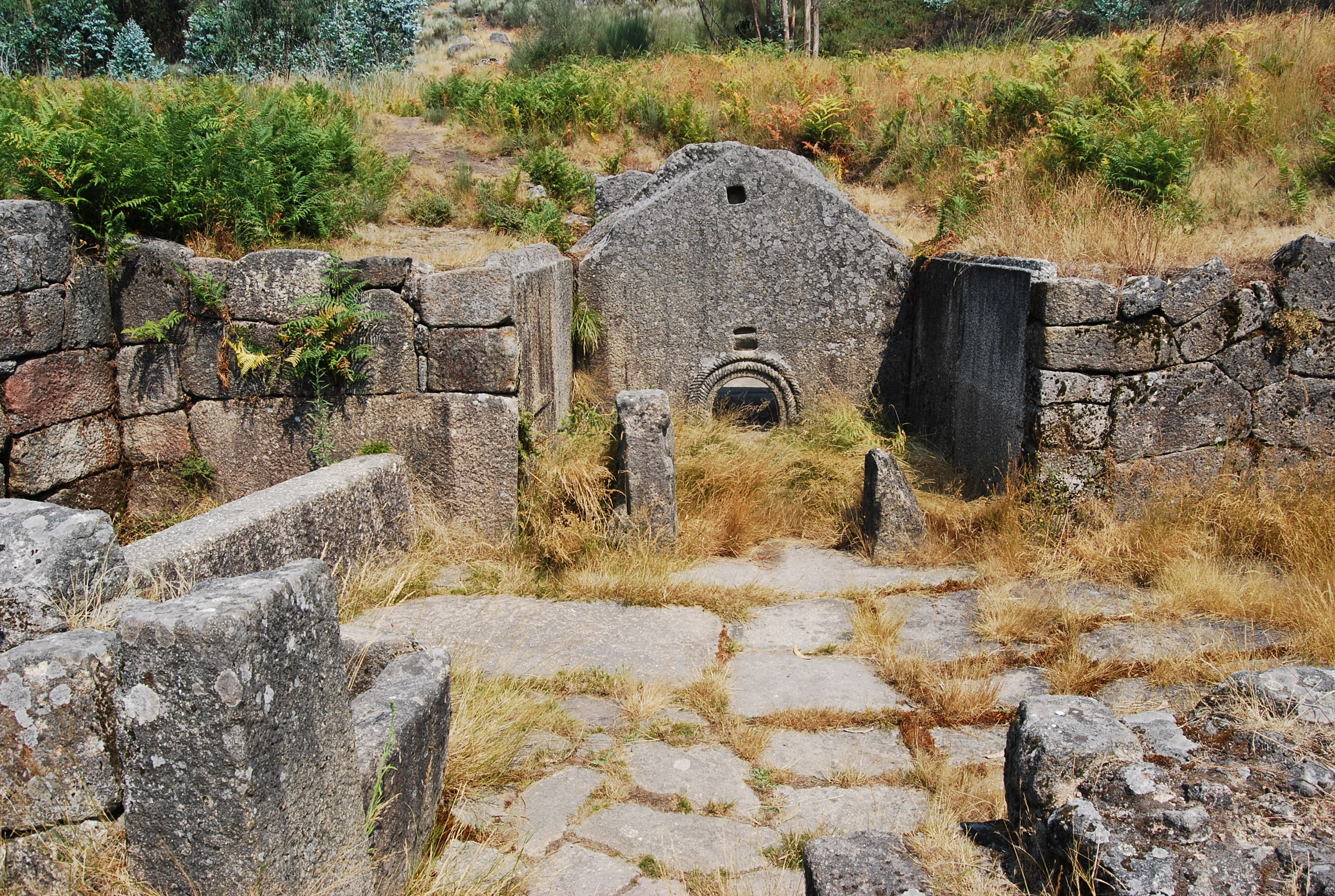
The Citânia's public bath, with the "Pedra Formosa" (Handsome Stone) visible in the center

== Findings ==
The archeological findings in Citânia de Sanfins belonged to multiple eras, for example:

- Portuguese coins: One of John I of Portugal and two of Sebastian of Portugal.
- An unknown coin minted in the 4th century CE.
- Forty-two Roman coins, from Tiberius to an indeterminate Emperor in the 4th century.
- Pottery of the Castro, Roman, and later times.

Many of the findings are displayed in the nearby Museu Arqueológico da Citânia de Sanfins in Sanfins de Ferreira.

== See also ==
- Citânia de Briteiros
- Castros in Portugal
- History of Portugal
