= Castro de Sacóias =

Castro of Sacóias Castro de Sacóias Fortified Settlement of Sacóias
- Castro
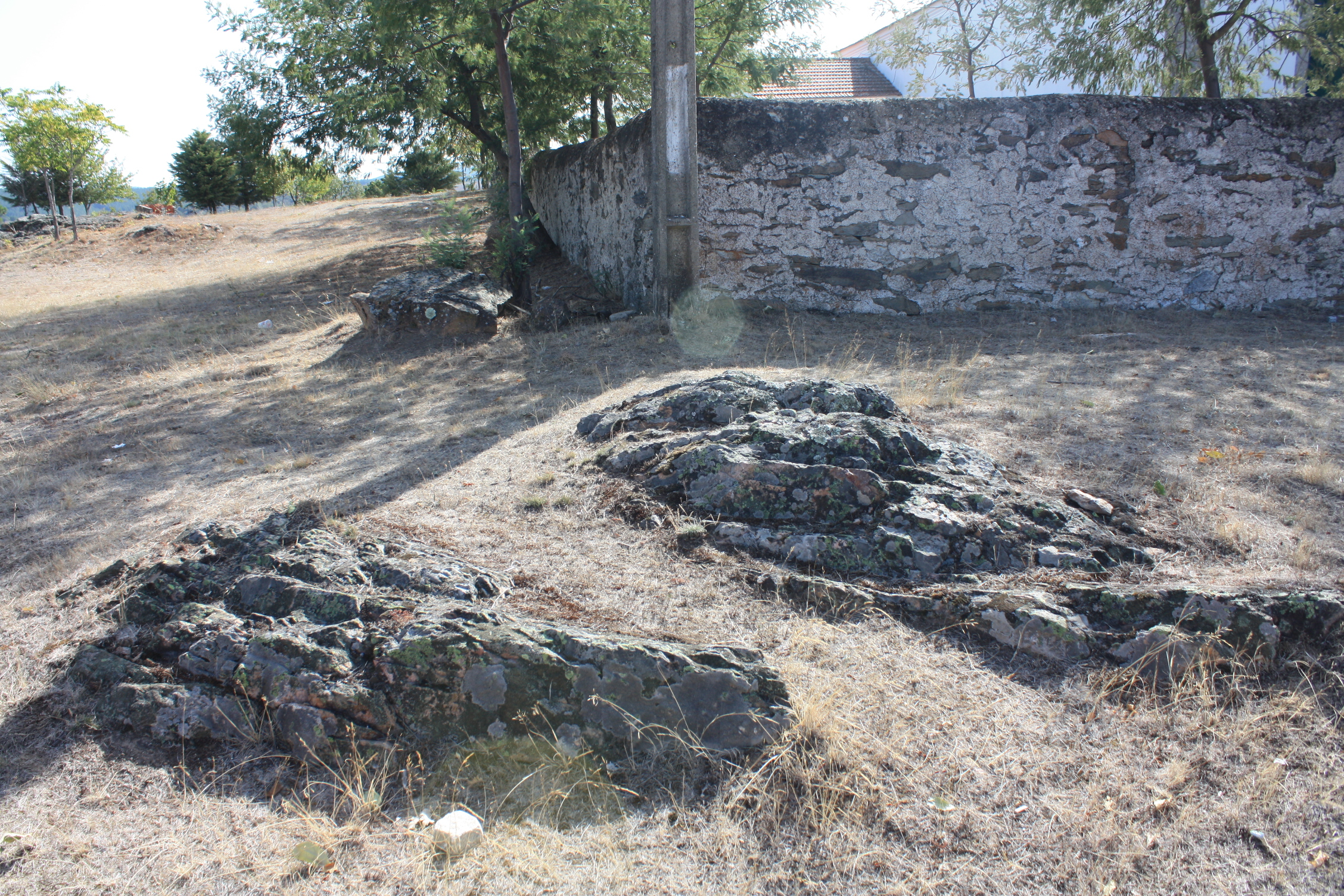
- Etymology: Sacóias
- Interactive map of Castro of Sacóias
- Coordinates: 41°51′47.26″N 6°41′24.84″W
- Country: Portugal
- Region: Norte
- Subregion: Alto Trás-os-Montes
- District: Bragança
- Municipality: Bragança
- Elevation: 680 m (2,230 ft)
- Management: Instituto Gestão do Patrimonio Arquitectónico e Arqueológico
- Operator: Câmara Municipal de Torres Vedras
- Status: National Monument; Monumento Nacional
- Listing: Decree 16 June 1910; DG136, 23 June 1910

The Castro of Sacóias (Portuguese: Povoado Fortificado de Sacóias/Castro de Sacóias) is a former fortified settlement and archeological site in the civil parish of Baçal, municipality of Bragança in the Alto Trás-os-Montes subregion of the Portuguese Norte Region.

== History ==
It is likely that the site was constructed during the Iron Age, and restructured over time. It was occupied by Roman settlers during the Roman occupation of the Iberian peninsula.

During the second half of the 18th century, the then-existing religious temple was moved from the Castro to the main settlement, to substitute an older chapel, then housing a baptismal fountain and conserving the Blessed Sacrament.

The Castro, and group of existing structures, are of individual importance that resulted in it being designated a National Monument in 1910, as well as a structure of municipal interest by the council of Bragança.

== Architecture ==
The site is located on an isolated, rural hilltop rising over the Chapel of Nossa Senhora da Assunção. It consists of a destroyed fortified settlement, with small walls constructed with small stones, in addition to remnants of tiles, bricks and millstones. Most of the artefacts unearthed from the site was collected by the Sociedade Martins Sarmento, and presented at the Municipal Museum of Bragança and Archaeological Museum.
