= Castle of Geraldo =

Castle in Évora, Portugal

- Castelo do Geraldo
- Évora, Alentejo Central, Alentejo in Portugal
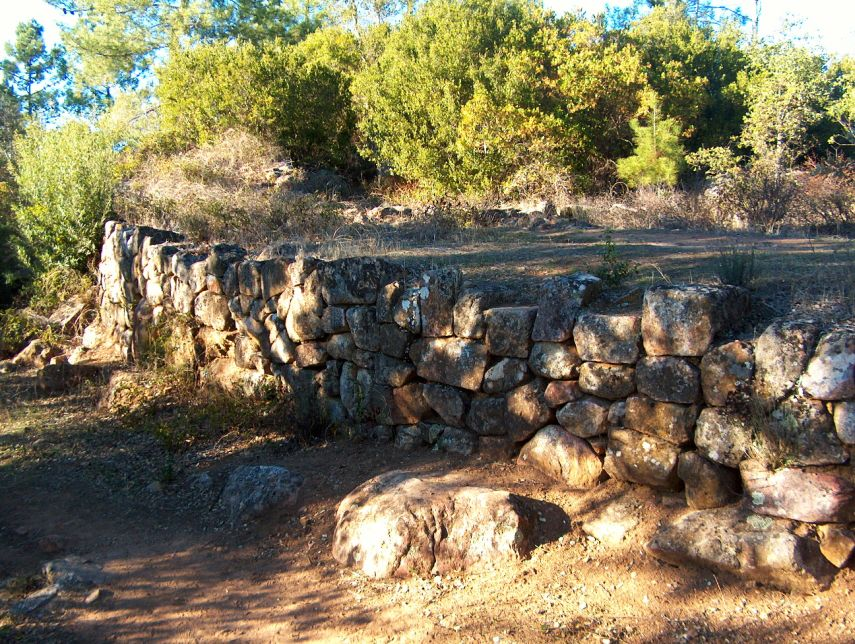
- The stone perimeter of the ruined castle of Geraldo/Giraldo

Site information
- Type: Castle
- Owner: Portuguese Republic
- Open to the public: Private

Location
- Coordinates: 38.5375°N 8.0332°W

The Castle of Geraldo (Portuguese: Castelo de Geraldo/Castelo de Giraldo) is a ruined medieval castle located in the civil parish of Nossa Senhora da Tourega e Nossa Senhora de Guadalupe, in the municipality of Évora, in the Portuguese district of Évora.

== History ==
The site in Nossa Senhora da Tourega e Nossa Senhora de Guadalupe has been continuously occupied since 3000 B.C. and 1000 A.D. It was founded on a castro fortified proto-historic structure, with its origin in the Bronze Age, Chalcolithic, with vestiges from older settlements.

During the Middle Ages it was sporadically re-occupied and reconstructed.

Records from the 15th century indicate that the castle was associated with Giraldo Sem Pavor, a warrior who conquered Évora from the Muslims in 1165.

Today the site is being analyzed for classification.

== Architecture ==
It is a semi-circular construction occupied a 114 metres (374 ft) perimeter. The walls constructed on its perimeter were erected during the medieval period. From its walls it is possible to see the city of Évora and town of Valverde (Nossa Senhora da Tourega).
