= Castro of Cidadelhe =

- Castro de Cidadelhe
- Interactive map of the Castro of Cidadelhe area

General information
- Type: Castro
- Location: Cidadelhe, Mesão Frio, Portugal
- Coordinates: 41°10′43″N 7°50′40″W
- Owner: Portuguese Republic

The Castro of Cidadelhe (Portuguese: Castro de Cidadelhe) is a Portuguese castro in civil parish of Cidadelhe, in the municipality of Mesão Frio.

== History ==
Cidadelhe was a fortified settlement of a proto-historic nature, later occupied by Roman and Medieval residents.

The settlement belonged to a medieval administrative territory conforming to a Suevic parish, with a royal congregation under the order of Ordoño II of León and part of the territory of Portucale (during the second year of his reign, in 911).

== Architecture ==
The castro is located in an isolated rural environment on a hilltop.

Two lines of walls encircle the castle and roadways/paths, composed of schist rock. In the interior of the ruins are several remains of residences, of a circular design, excavated by recent archaeologists.

Archaeological excavations under the direction of A. Coelho, F. da Silva, A. Baptista Lopes and Manuel Tuna, were attempted into two sectors: one elevated zone, defined by the first series of walls; and the second, lower, new the second series walls.
