= Citânia de Briteiros =

Archaeological site in Guimarães, Portugal

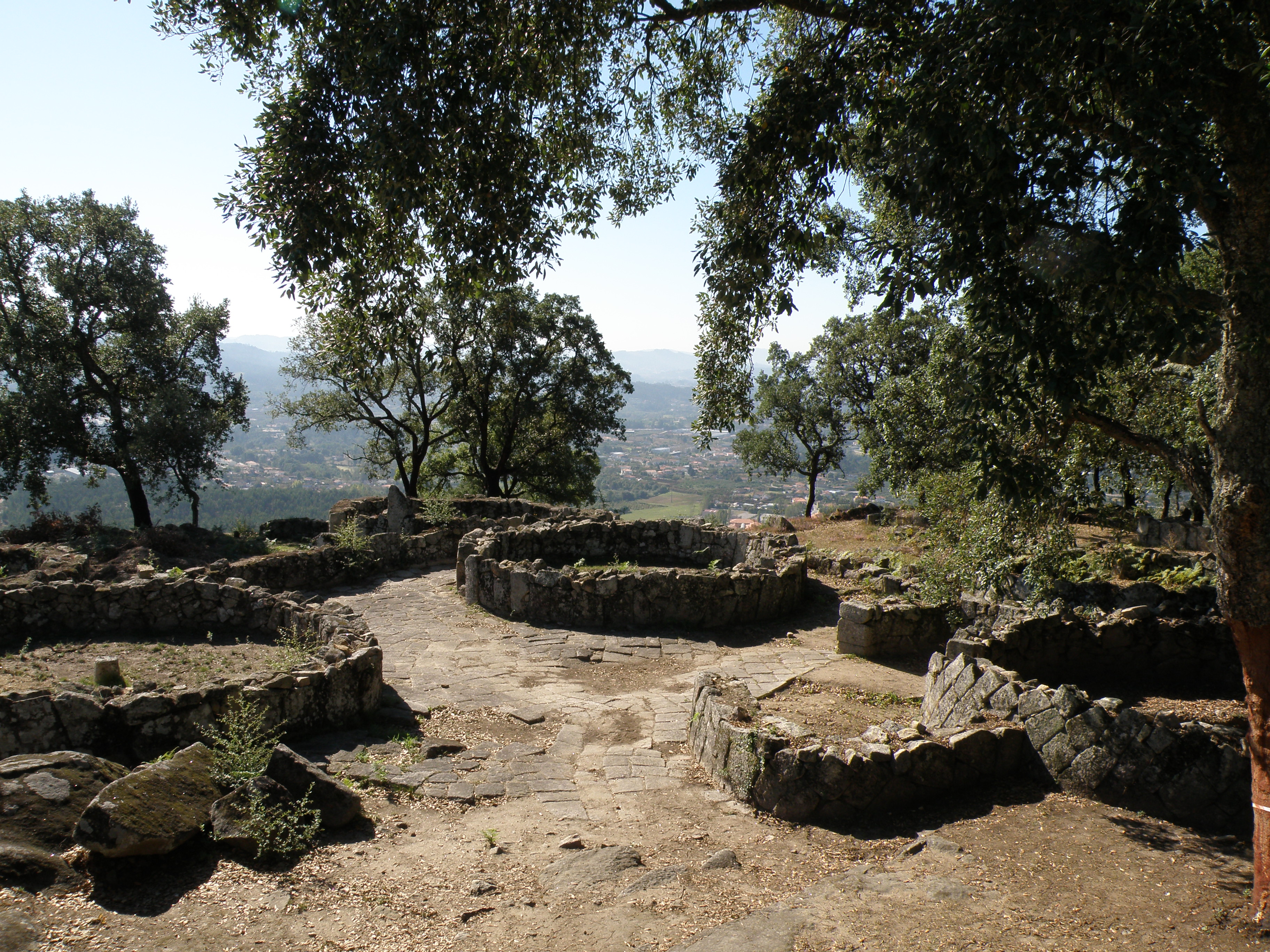
- View of Citânia de Briteiros, showing house ruins and stone paving

General information
- Type: Castro
- Architectural style: Iron Age
- Location: Briteiros São Salvador e Briteiros Santa Leocádia, Guimarães, Portugal
- Coordinates: 41°31′39″N 8°18′57″W
- Opened: 1st Century
- Owner: Portuguese Republic

Technical details
- Material: Granite

The Citânia de Briteiros is an archaeological site of the Castro culture located in the Portuguese civil parish of Briteiros São Salvador e Briteiros Santa Leocádia in the municipality of Guimarães; important for its size, "urban" form and developed architecture, it is one of the more excavated sites in northwestern Iberian Peninsula. Although primarily known as the remains of an Iron Age proto-urban hill fort (or oppidum), the excavations at the site have revealed evidence of sequential settlement, extending from the Bronze to Middle Ages.

== History ==
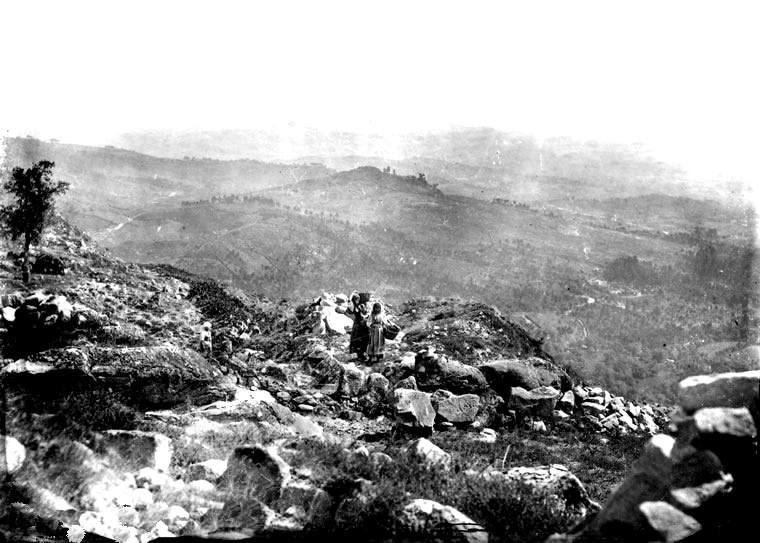
Citânia de Briteiros during an 1877 archaeological campaign.

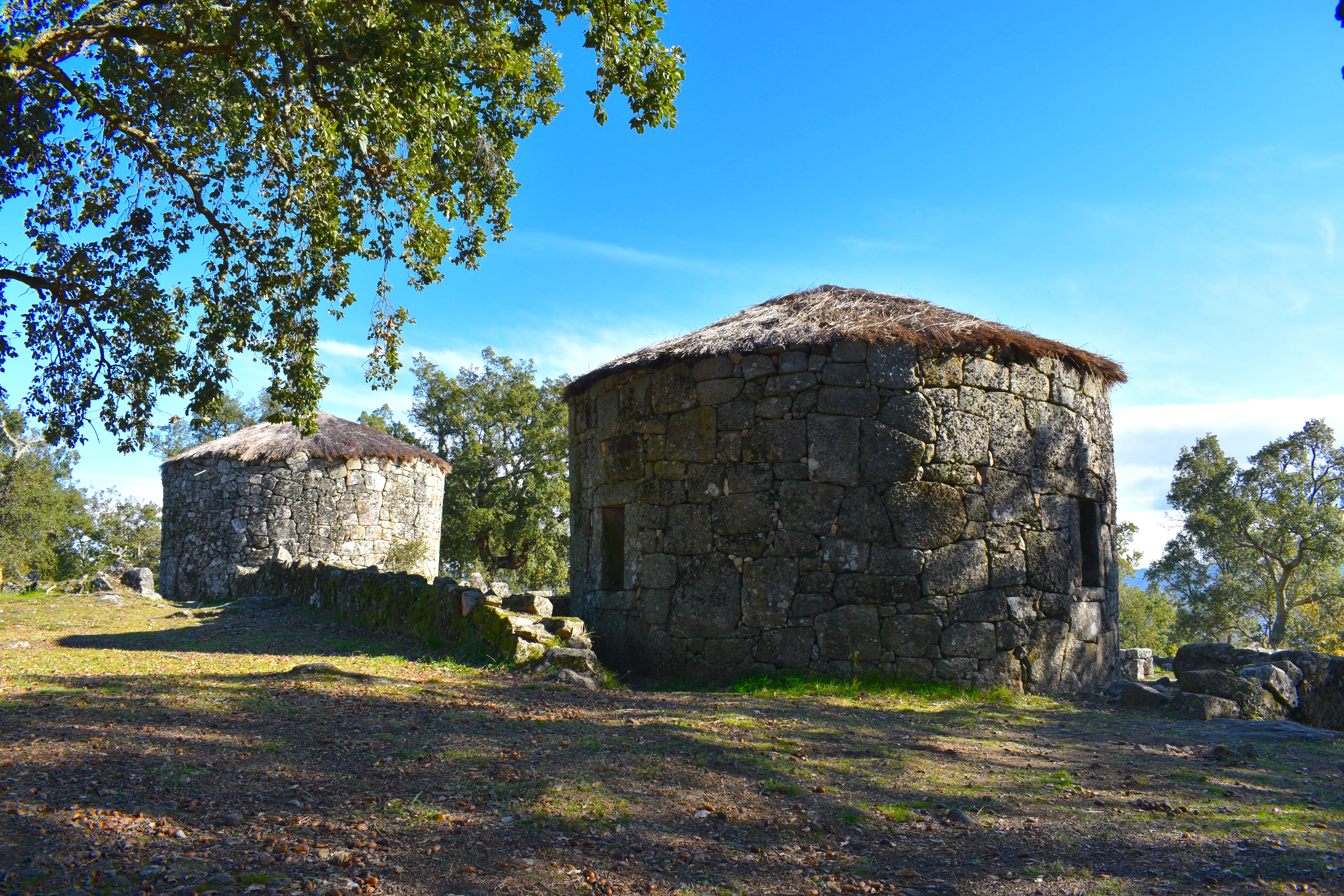
Castro houses reconstructed by Martins Sarmento at the Citânia de Briteiros.

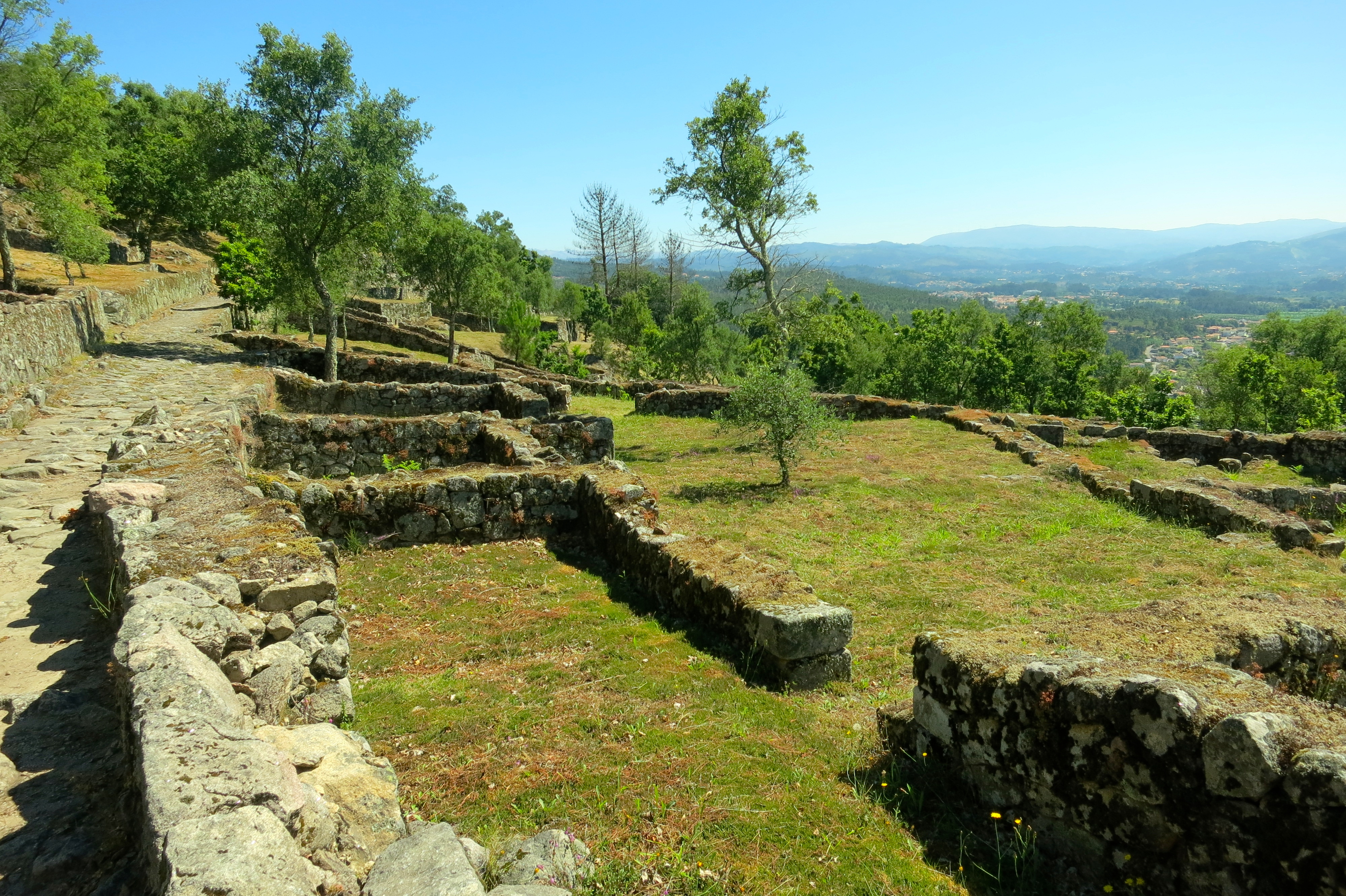
The lattice grid of walls that divide the Citânia structures.

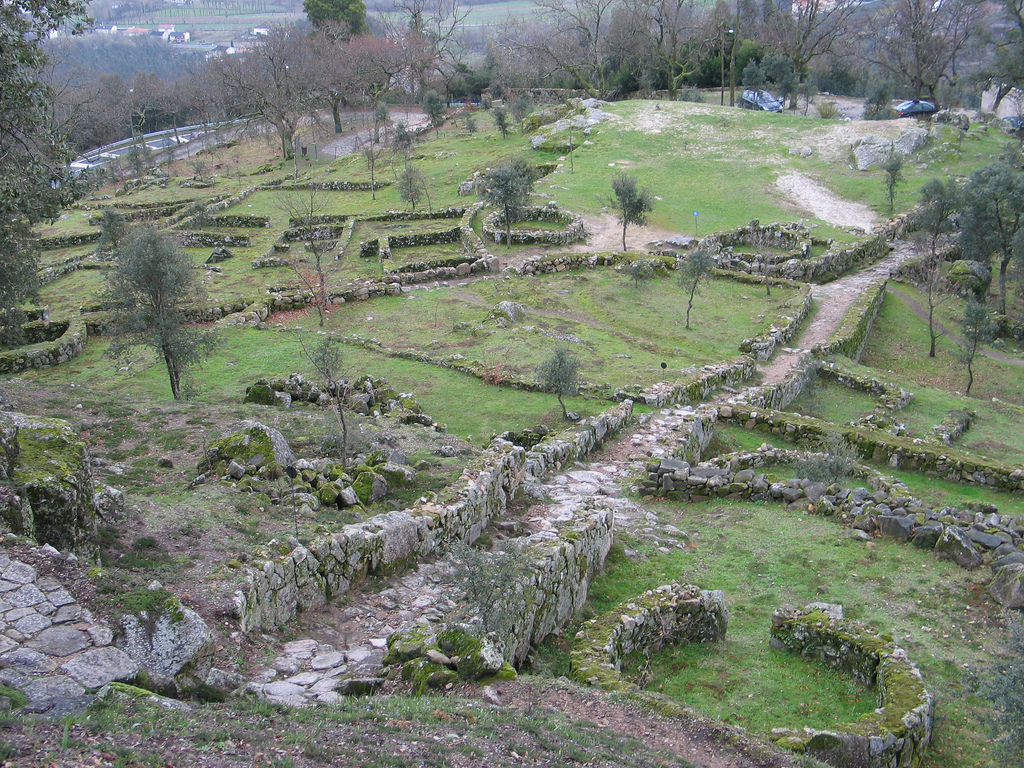
The contextual view of the "residences" within the structure.

The site was probably constructed between the first and second century BCE. Notes by Martins Sarmento and from recent explorations show that the Monte de São Romão was a favoured location for rock art engravings of the Atlantic Bronze Age, in the beginning of the first millennium BCE; it is not known when or why this first group left. Numerous early engraved rock surfaces were destroyed when many boulders were cut to build the ramparts and family compounds as the Castro settlement grew. Little is known of the beginnings of the Castro occupation, as no structures from the late Bronze Age have been found. Pottery from the early Iron Age has been found, when the settlement would already have been fortified. The majority of the ruins visible today have been dated from the second Iron Age, especially the last two centuries BCE.

The Castro inhabitants are believed to have been Celtic. Approximately half the pre-Latin toponyms of Gallaecia were Celtic, while the rest were either non Celtic western Indo-European, or mixed toponyms containing Celtic and non-Celtic elements.

Sometime in the first century AD the settlement was occupied by Roman settlers. Expansion of the Roman Empire into the region has left evidence in the oppidum at Briteiros, in the form of coins (those of Augustus and Tiberius are the most numerous found, with smaller numbers of coins of the Republic, and the Flavians and the Antonines) ranging from the 1st century BCE to the 2nd century CE. A small number of amphorae and red pottery pieces have been found, and there is some evidence of Romanization in the architecture of the alleys and buildings of the eastern slope, but overall the visible impact of Roman occupiers is not strong. The reduced number of later coin and pottery finds suggests that occupation of the oppidum was declining from the 1st century CE, resulting in the 2nd century with very few people living within the ramparts. Evidence shows that there was a transitory reoccupation in the High Middle Ages, which included the building of a medieval chapel and graveyard on the acropolis.

The site has been studied extensively since 1874, with the first excavations beginning in 1875, when the Portuguese archaeologist Francisco Martins Sarmento began annual excavation campaigns while helping to develop methods of archaeological research and preservation in Portugal. Sarmento's campaigns led to the discovery of much of the ruins of the acropolis (the highest portion of the settlement), and he reconstructed a pair of dwellings on the site from his research. Continuing discoveries during the first decades of work led Martins Sarmento to purchase the land on which the settlement lay, which was regularly continued by the Sociedade Martins Sarmento. The land and Martins Sarmento's research materials were bequeathed to the Society. From the 1930s through the 1960s, new excavations were carried out by the Society, supervised by Mário Cardozo, which led to the discovery of large parts of the settlement on the eastern slope and additional portions of the acropolis. Further surveys were made in the 1970s (in the north-eastern section), and in 2002, 2005 and 2006.

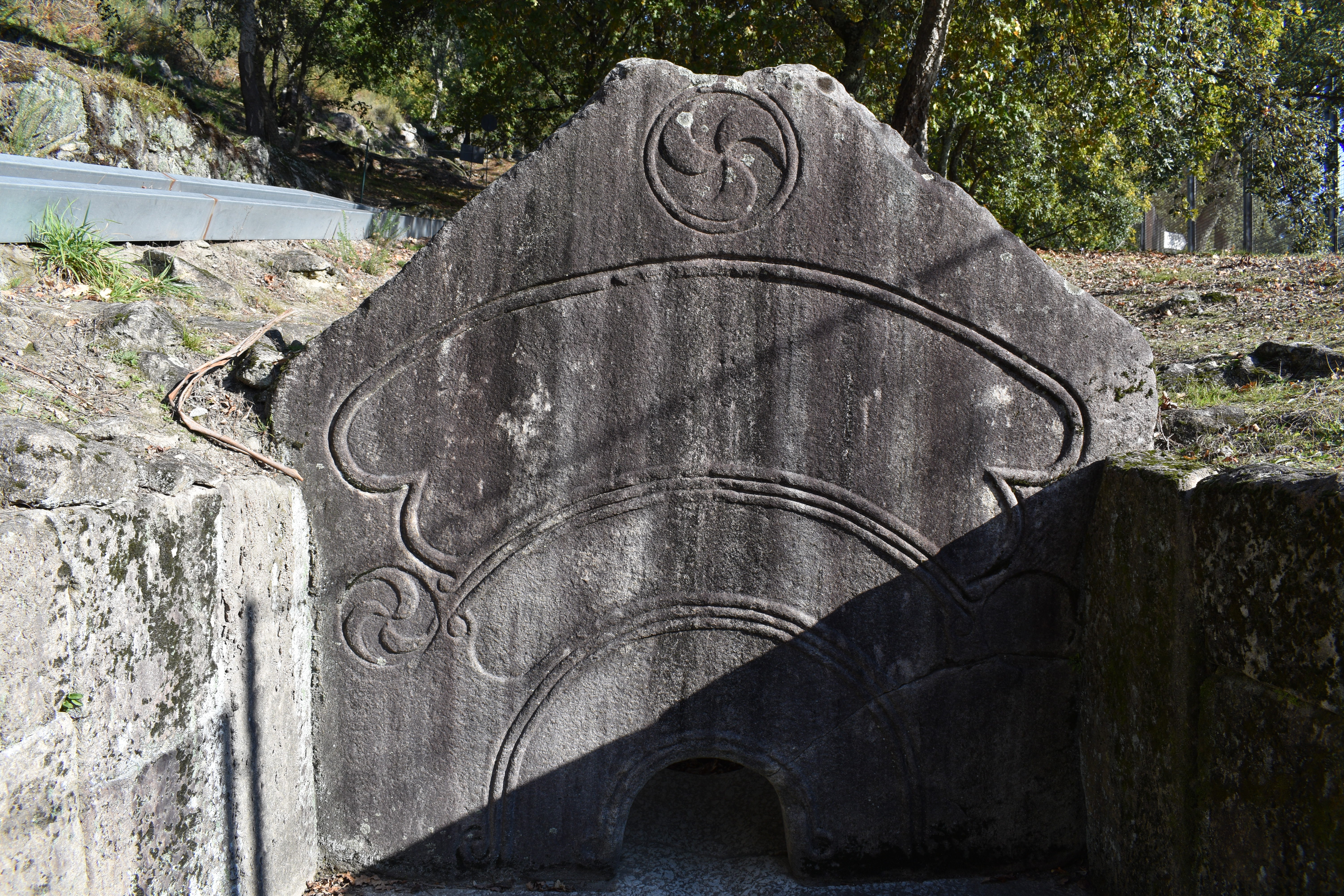
A decorated stone with swastika-like geometric figures, at the baths of Citânia de Briteiros.

The site was classified and protected by IPPAR as a Portuguese National Monument in 1910.

As research methods developed over the 19th and 20th centuries, the successive excavations at the Briteiros site adapted to evolving concepts, and gaps remain in the scientific knowledge of the site. In 2004 a project was initiated under the responsibility of Minho University with the collaboration of the Martins Sarmento Society to integrate the past studies and improve the conservation of the site.

Beginning in 1956, the excavations took on a new character, as archaeological objects began being collected from the site, a process that continued in digs in 1958 to 1961, 1964 and 1968. In 1962, the archaeological work was carried out by the Serviços de Conservação (Conservation Services).

In 1974 and 1977, there were works to conserve and clean the area, including various larger projects. Between 1977 and 1978, archaeological interventions were handled by a team that included Armando Coelho Ferreira da Silva and Rui Centeno, from the Faculty of Letters of the University of Porto.

Following excavations and surveys by archaeologist Francisco Sande Lemos, the Sociedade Martins Sarmento (UAM) proposed (in 2006) the creation of a proto-history biological estate, as a form of interpretative centre, alongside the site, to revitalize the location. Strata were discovered during this time that indicated a human occupation before the reorganization of the urban space. Between October and November, a secondary baths near the national E.N.306 roadway.

== Architecture ==
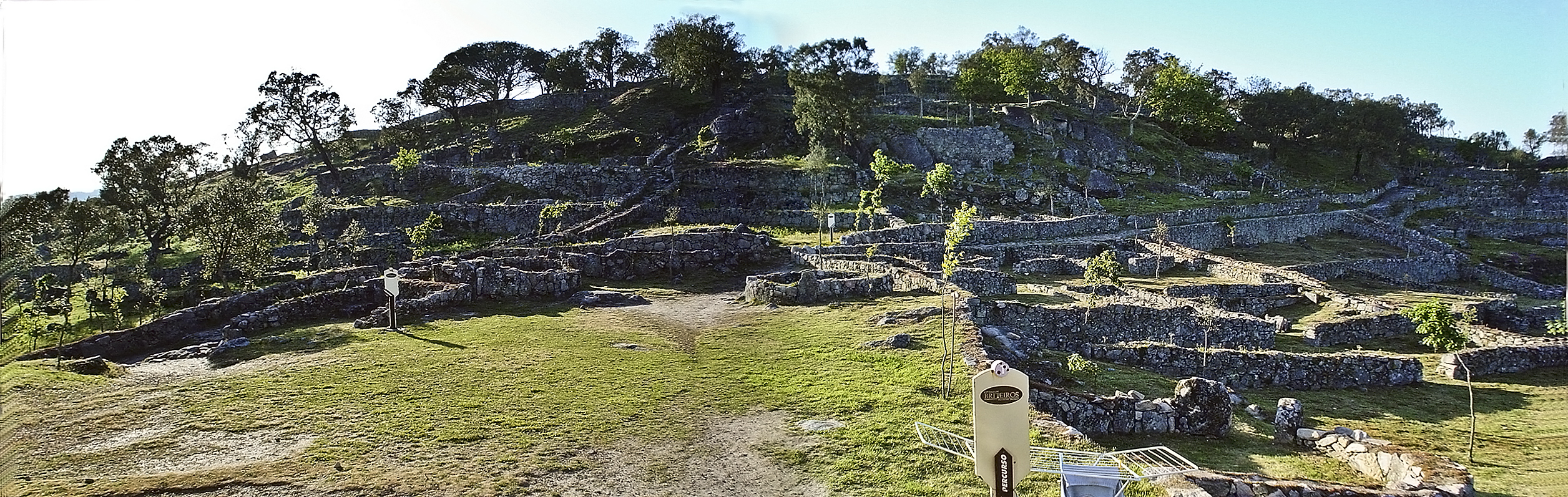
Panorama of the hill of the Citânia de Briteiros, view from the south

The site is situated on a small promontory called Monte de São Romão between the civil parishes of Salvador de Briteiros and Donim, about 15 kilometres (9.3 mi) northwest of Guimarães. Situated over the Ave River, the site offers an extensive view over the river and its valley, and over an early north-south trade and communication between the Douro and Minho river valleys. The moderate elevation of the site, the temperate and humid climate and the nearby river also provided rich natural resources for exploitation and settlement. The Briteiros site is called a citânia or cividade (from Latin civitas, for city), due to its large size and city-like structure; other examples from the region and period include the Citânia de Sanfins and Cividade de Terroso, all Gallaeci Celtic cultural period.

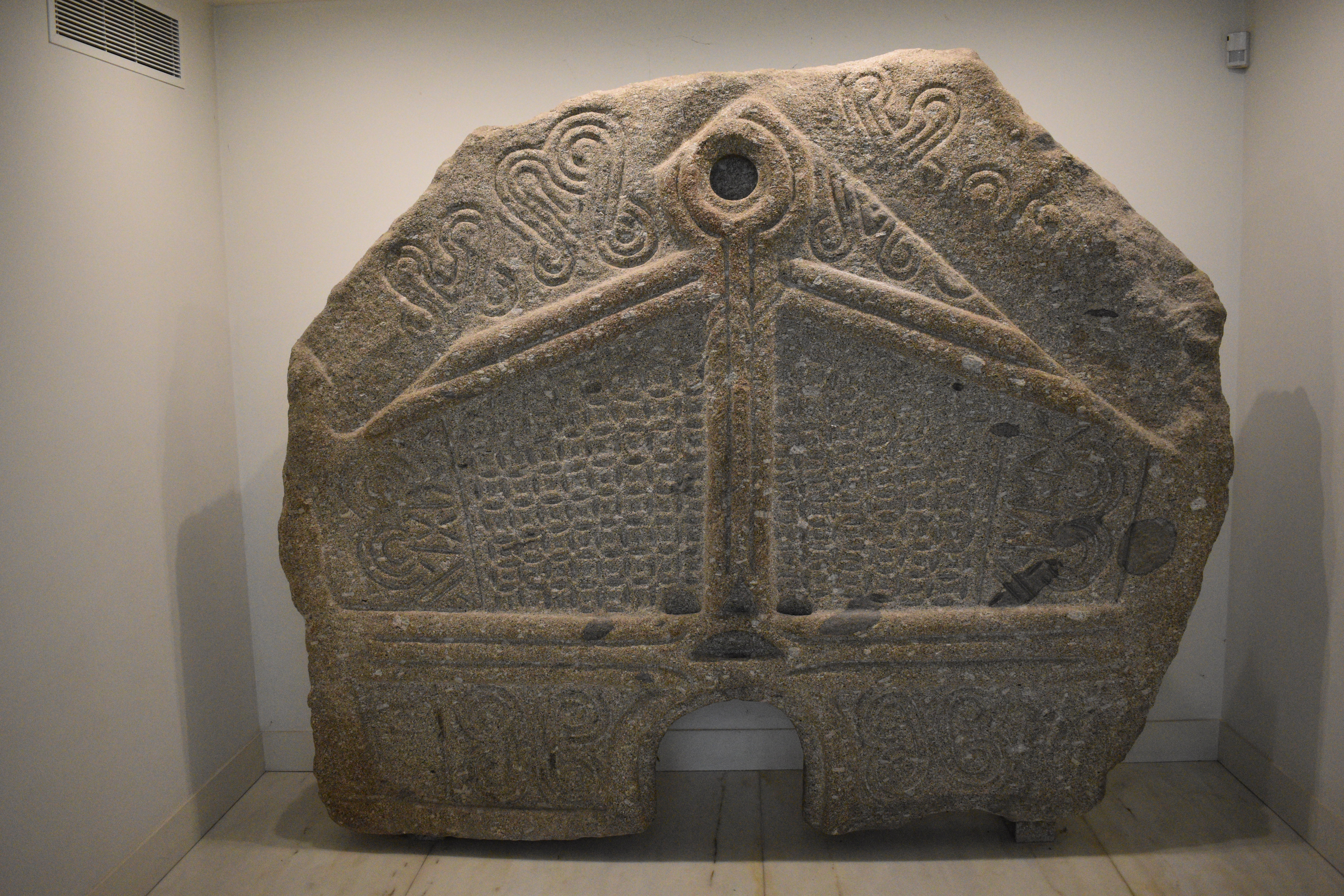
The Pedra Formosa from the baths of the Citânia de Briteiros.

House ornaments with various geometric elements
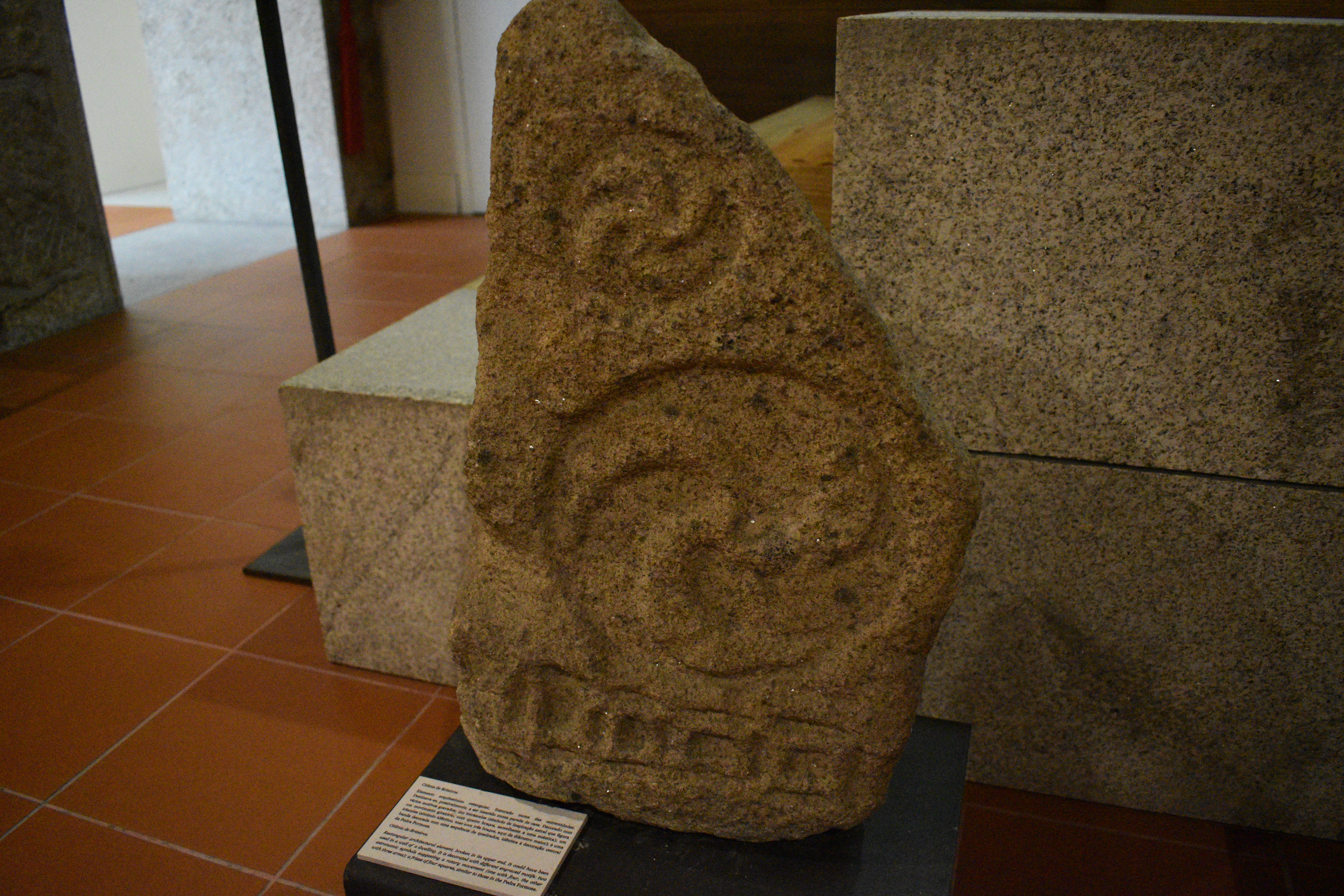
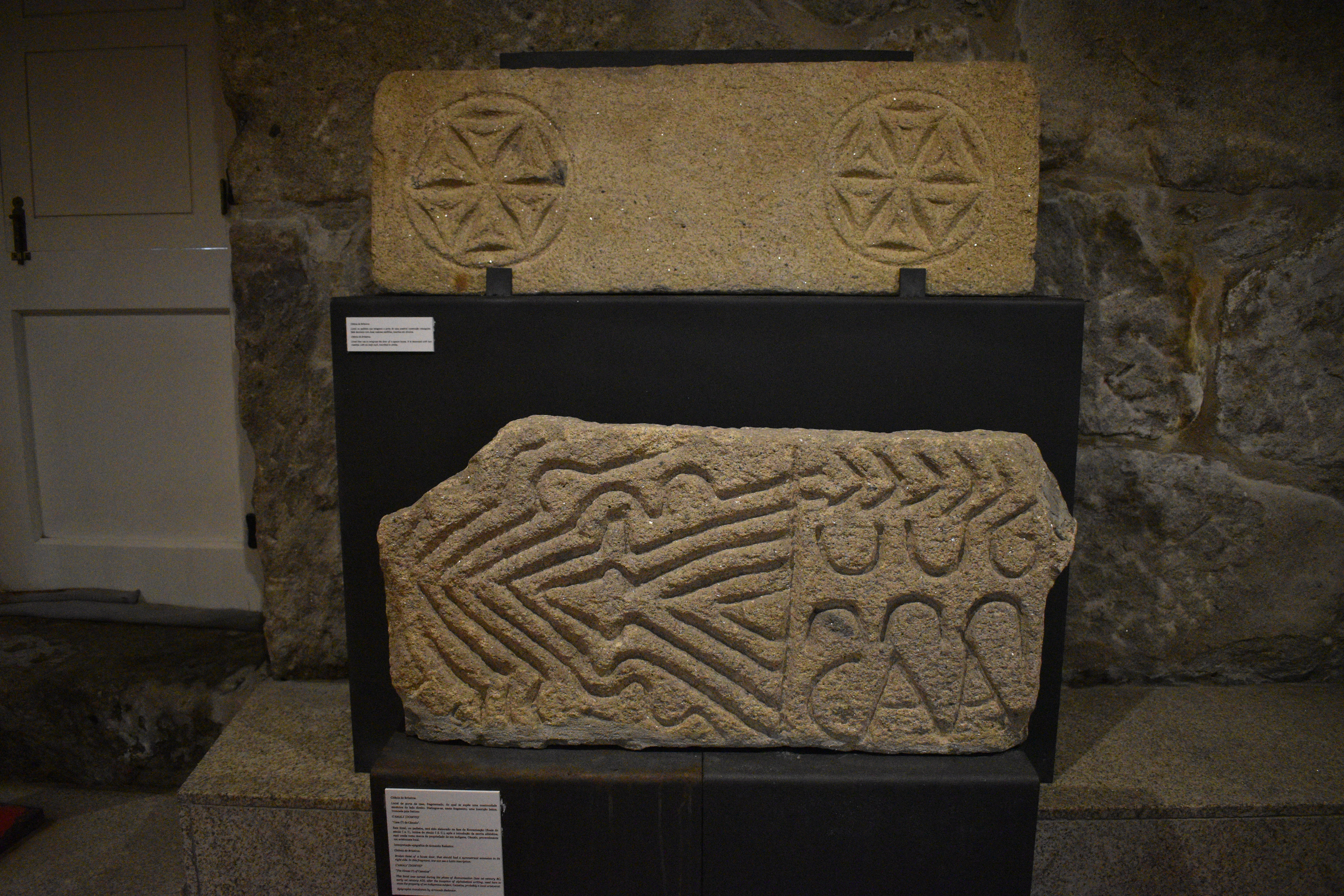

The visible ruins of the walled village or hill fort include a plan of great dimensions with four lines of walls and approximately oval shape. The main platform covers 250 by 150 metres (820 ft × 490 ft), following along two principal axis. The total area of the site covers an area of about 24 hectares, of which only 7 are visitable. The defensive ramparts include a partially maintained fourth line to the north and a pair of moats. The preserved walls measure 1–3 metres (3.3–9.8 ft) thick and less than 2 metres (6.6 ft) high; a portion of the wall was restored by Martins Sarmento that measures almost 4 metres (13 ft) high. The walls were built using irregular dry stone masonry methods, edged on both sides. The innermost rampart was partially absorbed into the urban development by being incorporated as a support wall for several family compounds. Gates were cut through each of the ramparts to provide passage; some of the gate openings still have hollows where palisades were placed. Ramps and stairs providing access to the top of the third rampart are evident.

Briteiros is an unusual castros, having its streets arranged into a roughly grid pattern. The "urbanized" area of the settlement includes an acropolis surrounded by the first rampart in an elevated area of about 7 hectares.

Around 100 residential compounds were found in this area, grouped into small blocks divided by several streets. Each of the compounds, was delimited by masonry walls and provided living and working space for a large family. These structures included one to three circular stone houses, some large with an atrium, where the nuclear family lived; other structures within the compound housed other family members, served as stables or stored agricultural tools, food, and rain or spring water. Daily tasks and crafts were performed in the stone-paved courtyard of the compound, which formed the center of family life in the citânia. Assuming around 6 people per family unit, a population of the acropolis of around 625 people has been estimated, but estimates may reach as many as 1500 for the entire settlement when excavations are made of the eastern and south-western extremities.

The ramparts and main roads are the most visible part of the site, although there are conduits that carried water from a spring on the hill, fountains, two public bath structures and a large meeting or council house. The ruins of one bath (accidentally found during road work in the 1930s) is the best-preserved construction of its kind in northern Portugal and Galicia. Including a decorative monolith of almost 3 square metres (32 ft^{2}), called the Pedra Formosa (the "handsome stone") thought to have once formed part of a burial chamber. Between the second and third line of defences, along the south, is a structure with kiln.

== See also ==
- Castro culture
- Hill fort (Portugal and Spain)
