= List of Lusitanian deities =

This list contains purported Lusitanian deities, that is the gods and goddesses of Lusitanian mythology.

== A ==
- Abna
- Aernus
- Aetio
- Albucelainco
- Ambieicris
- Arabo
- Aracus
- Arentia
- Arentio
- Ares Lusitani
- Ataegina

== B ==
- Bandua
- Bormanicus (Borvo)

== C ==
- Cabuniaegenis
- Candeberonio
- Cariocecus
- Cauleces
- Collouesei
- Coronus
- Coruae
- Coso

== D ==
- Debaroni Muceaigaego
- Dercetius
- Duberdicus
- Durius

== E ==
- Endovelicus
- Edovio
- Eniragillo
- Epona
- Erbina

== F ==
- Frovida

== I ==
- Igaedo
- Ilurbeda

== L ==
- Laepo
- Laho
- Laneana
- Laraucus
- Lucubo
- Lurunis

== M ==
- Miraro Samaco
- Moelio
- Moricilo
- Munidis

== N ==
- Nabia
- Netaci
- Neto

== O ==
- Ocaere

== Q ==
- Quangeio

== R ==
- Reo
- Reue
- Runesocesius

== S ==
- Sulae Nantugaicae

== T ==
- Tameobrigus
- Tomios
- Toga
- Tongoe
- Tongoenabiagus
- Torolo Gombiciego
- Trebaruna
- Turiacus
- Trebopala

== V ==
- Verore
- Vestio Alonieco

== Name unknown ==
- A sun goddess later assimilated by Virgin Mary as Nossa Senhora d'Antime.

== References and bibliography ==
Bibliography

- Coutinhas, José Manuel - Aproximação à identidade etno-cultural dos Callaici Bracari. Porto. 2006.
- García Fernández-Albalat, Blanca - Guerra y Religión en la Gallaecia y la Lusitania Antiguas. A Coruña. 1990.
- McKenna, Stephen. Paganism and Pagan Survivals in Spain up to the Fall of the Visigothic Kingdom.
- Martínez, Sonia María García. "La epigrafía romana del concelho de Guimarães. Un estado de la cuestión". In: Revista de Guimarães, n.º 105, 1995, pp. 139–171.
- Pedreño, Juan Carlos Olivares. "Teonimos indigenas masculinos del ambito Lusitano-Galaico: un intento de síntesis". In: Revista de Guimarães, Volume Especial, I, Guimarães, 1999, pp. 277–296.
- Pedreño, Juan Carlos Olivares - Los Dioses de la Hispania Céltica. Madrid. 2002.
- Robalo, Mário. Deuses de pedra .
