= Triad (religion) =

Grouping of three gods

A triad, in a religious context, refers to a grouping of three gods, usually by importance or similar roles. A triad of gods were usually not considered to be one and the same being, or different aspects of a single deity as in a Trinity or Triple deity.

Triads of three closely associated deities were commonly found throughout the ancient world, and in particular in the religious traditions of Ancient Greece and Egypt.

== List of deity triads ==
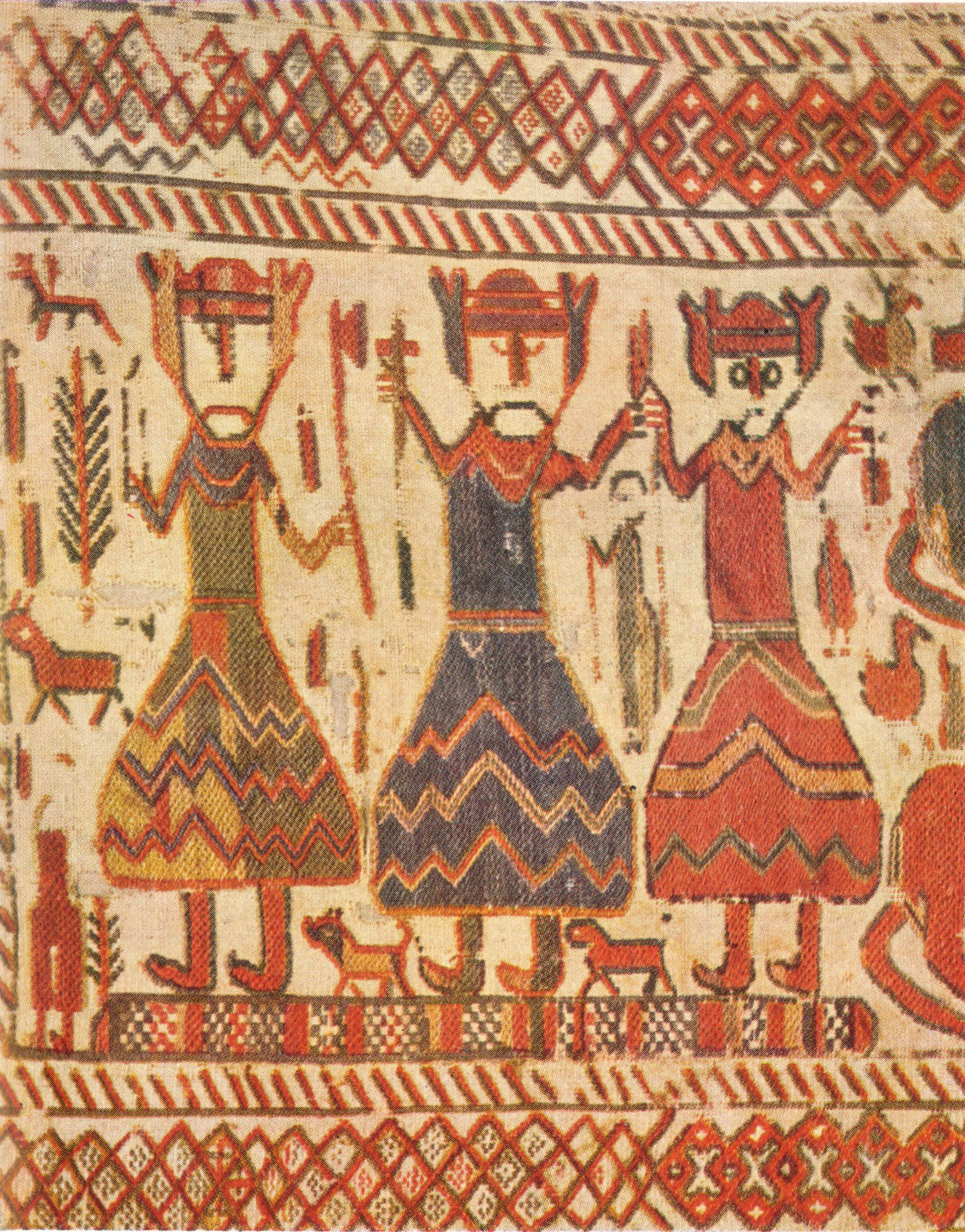
This part of a 12th-century Swedish tapestry has been interpreted to show, from left to right, the one-eyed Odin, the hammer-wielding Thor and Freyr holding up an ear of corn.

=== Historical polytheism ===
- The Classical Greek Olympic triad of Zeus (king of the gods), Athena (goddess of war and intellect) and Apollo (god of the sun, culture and music)
- The Delian chief triad of Leto (mother), Artemis (daughter) and Apollo (son) and second Delian triad of Athena, Zeus and Hera
- The Eleusinian Mysteries centered on Persephone (daughter), Demeter (mother), and Triptolemus (to whom Demeter taught agriculture)
- In ancient Egypt there were many triads:
  - The Osirian (or Abydos) triad of Osiris (husband), Isis (wife), and Horus (son)
  - The Theban triad of Amun, Mut and Khonsu
  - The Memphite triad of Ptah, Sekhmet and Nefertem
  - The Elephantine triad of Khnum (god of the source of the Nile), Satet (personification of the floods of the Nile), and Anuket (goddess of the Nile)
  - The sun god Ra, whose form in the morning was Khepri, at noon Re-Horakhty and in the evening Atum, and many others
- The Hellenistic Egypt triad of Isis, Alexandrian Serapis and Harpocrates (a Hellenized version of the already referred Isis-Osiris-Horus triad), though in the early Ptolemaic period Serapis, Isis and Apollo (who was sometimes identified with Horus) were preferred.
- The Roman Capitoline Triad of Jupiter (father), Juno (wife), and Minerva (daughter)
- The Roman pleibian triad of Ceres, Liber Pater and Libera (or its Greek counterpart with Demeter, Dionysos and Kore)
- The Julian triads of the early Roman Principate:
  - Venus Genetrix, Divus Iulius, and Clementia Caesaris
  - Divus Iulius, Divi filius and Genius Augusti
  - Eastern variants of the Julian triad, e.g. in Asia Minor: Dea Roma, Divus Iulius and Genius Augusti (or Divi filius)
- The Matres (Deae Matres/Dea Matrona) in Roman mythology
- The Fates, Moirai or Furies in Greek and Roman mythology: Clotho or Nona the Spinner, Lachesis or Decima the Weaver, and Atropos or Morta the Cutter of the Threads of Life. One's Lifeline was Spun by Clotho, Woven into the tapestry of Life by Lachesis, and the thread Cut by Atropos.
- The Hooded Spirits or Genii Cucullati in Gallo-Roman times
- The main supranational triad of the ancient Lusitanian mythology and religion and Portuguese Neopagans made up of the couple Arentia and Arentius and Quangeius and Trebaruna, followed by a minor Gallaecian-Lusitanian triad of Bandua (under many natures), Nabia and Reve female nature: Reva
- The sisters Uksáhkká, Juksáhkká and Sáhráhkká in Sámi mythology.
- Odin, Vili and Ve in Norse mythology
- The Norns in Norse mythology
- Odin, Freyr, and Thor in Norse mythology. Odin is the god of wisdom and knowledge, Freyr is the god of fertility and prosperity, and Thor is the god of thunder and strength.
- The Triglav in Slavic mythology
- Perkūnas (god of heaven), Patrimpas (god of earth) and Pikuolis (god of death) in Prussian mythology
- The Zorya or Auroras in Slavic mythology
- The Charites or Graces in Greek mythology
- The One, the Thought (or Intellect) and the Soul in Neoplatonism

=== Judaism ===
Jewish orthodoxy emphatically believes in the oneness of an infinite God, This understanding is rooted in the core belief of "Shema" (Hear, O Israel): "The Lord our God, the Lord is one". Yet some have suggested, for various reasons, that this is not the case. They conclude that because the words Adonai and Elohim are both plural, it must refer to a plurality or compound unity of the Jewish God. However, this assumption is often made from those who have no formal background in Hebrew and ancient Jewish works.

For example, the cited encounter of Abraham in Gen 18 with the three men or angels is often anachronistically used to leverage the Christian dogma of the Trinity. Also, the word "Adonai" in the chapter is used to bolster these claims of plurality. However, Jewish scholarship has repeatedly refuted these claims linguistically and doctrinally.

Further, other critics of Judaism attempt to utilize kabbalistic works as proof of Jews hiding the true nature of Judaism. These detractors, often conspiratorial in nature, dissect passages and piece them back together without any connection to the original author’s intent or meaning. While Kabbalah explores different aspects of God's presence, it does not depict God as a Trinity or Triad. It is true, Kabbalists use the concept of the Sefirot, which are ten emanations or aspects of God's presence. However, these are not distinct persons within God or godhead, but rather different ways in which God reveals himself to the world (such as wisdom or love). The claim that Jews are hiding a Trinitarian concept within Kabbalah is based on misunderstandings of both Kabbalah and the Christian Trinity. It is more accurate to say that Jewish and Christian understandings of God's nature are distinct and have different theological implications. This is not a new or recent debate but rather a long standing battle that has a complex history involving Jews, Christians, Muslims and Atheists, each with its own history and motivations. Within Judaism, the concept of God being a Triad or Trinity is not supported, but many external opinions are still vigorously debated by others.

=== Christian Trinity ===
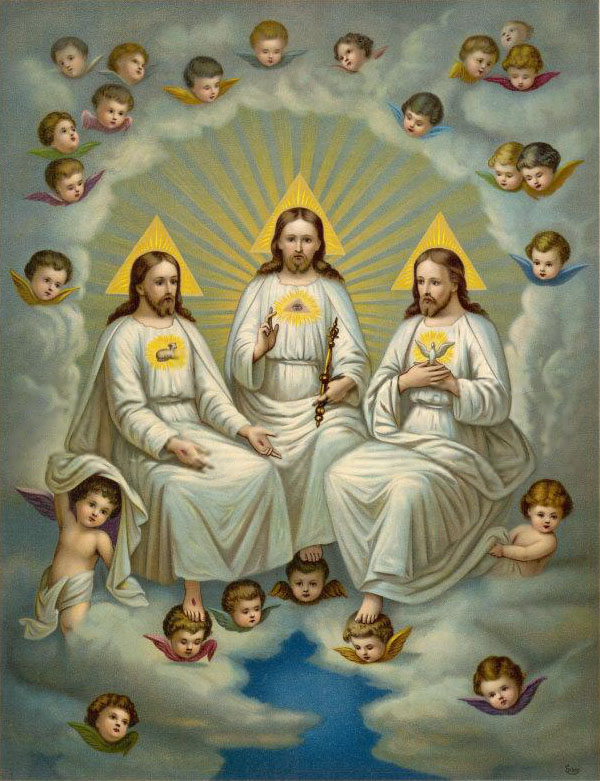
The Holy Trinity by Fridolin Leiber

The Christian doctrine of the Trinity (Latin: Trinitas, lit. 'triad', from Latin: trinus "threefold") defines God as being one god existing in three coequal, coeternal, consubstantial persons: God the Father, God the Son (Jesus Christ) and God the Holy Spirit — three distinct persons sharing one essence. In this context, the three persons define who God is, while the one essence defines what God is. This doctrine is called Trinitarianism and its adherents are called trinitarians, while its opponents are called antitrinitarians or nontrinitarians. Nontrinitarian positions include Unitarianism, Binitarianism and Modalism.

=== Dharmic religions ===
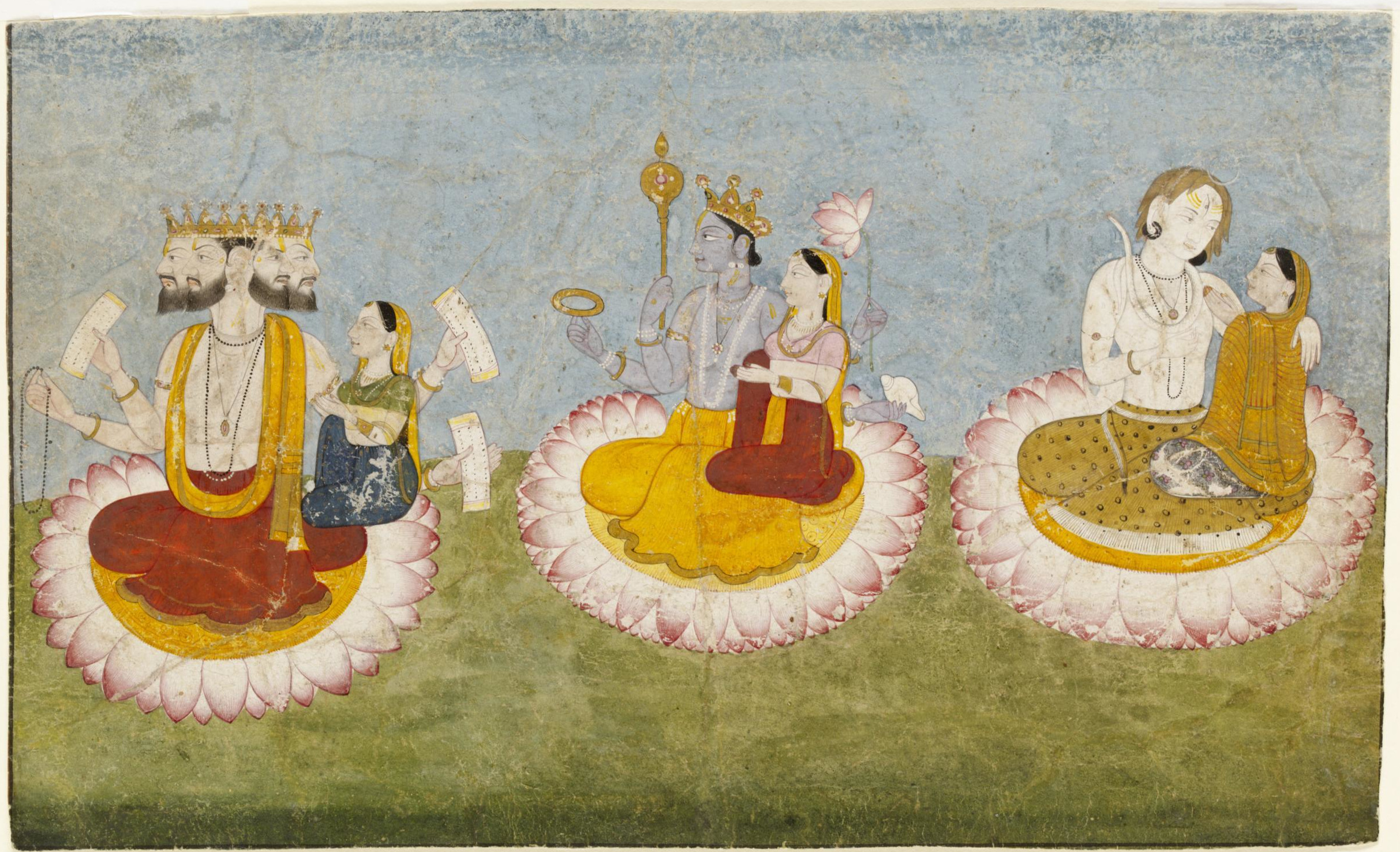
Brahma, Vishnu and Shiva seated on lotuses with their consorts: Saraswati, Lakshmi, and Paravati respectively. ca 1770.

- Amitabha Triad - Amitābha, Avalokiteśvara and Mahāsthāmaprāpta in Mahayana Buddhism
- Ayyavazhi Trinity
- Brahma, Vishnu, and Shiva (Trimurti) in Puranic Hinduism
- Mitra, Aryaman, and Varuna in early vedic Hinduism
- Ganga, Yamuna, and Saraswati merged in one is the Triveni
- Sahā Triad - Shakyamuni, Avalokitesvara and Ksitigarbha in Mahayana Buddhism
- Shakti, Lakshmi, and Saraswati (Tridevi) in Puranic Hinduism

=== Other Eastern religions ===
- Three Pure Ones in Taoism
- Fu Lu Shou in Taoism
- San-shan kuo-wang, Lords of the Three Mountains in Chinese folk religion
- The Ahuric Triad of Ahura Mazda, Mithra and Apam Napat in Zoroastrianism. Also, in Achaemenid times, Mazda, Mithra and Anahita.
- Amaterasu, Tsukuyomi and Susanoo in Shinto.
- Tản Viên Sơn Thánh, Thần Cao Sơn and Thần Quý Minh, Three mountain gods rule the Ba Vì mountain range in Vietnamese folk religion.
- Mẫu Thượng Thiên, Mẫu Thoải and Mẫu Thượng Ngàn in Đạo Mẫu.

=== Neopaganism ===
- Triple Goddess (Neopaganism), the Maiden-Mother-Crone deity of Wicca and other neopagan faiths.

== Esotericism ==
- Nuit, Hadit and Ra Hoor Khuit in the Thelemic spiritual system

== See also ==
- List of deities
- Les Lavandières
- Mythography
- Thraetaona
- Three hares
- Trichotomy (philosophy)
- Trifunctional hypothesis
- Trinity
- Triple deity
- Trita
- Tritheism
