= Runesocesius =

Lusitanian god

Runesocesius was a deity whose name appears on an inscription from the region of Évora, the Roman Ebora in modern Portugal, in the area inhabited by the Celtici in Lusitania. He has generally been thought of as a Lusitanian god.

== Discovery & interpretation ==
At the close of the 19th Century, Portuguese archaeologists discovered and examined a Roman dedication near Évora. The inscription was in Latin and read SANCTRVNESOCESIOSACRVGLIC ... QVINTCINV ... BALS. In a paper submitted to the French Société des Antiquaires, it was interpreted as Sancto Runeso Cesio Sacrum G. Licinius Quinctinus Balsensis: a dedication by Gaius Licinius Quinctinus of Balsa to a previously unknown god, Runesus Cesius. The name was interpreted as Celtic, with "Cesius" an allograph for gaesius and hence deriving from the roots *runa- and *gaiso- meaning "the Mysterious One of the Javelin (or Spear)"

An alternative reading, as a single word Runesocesius, was proposed by J M Blazquez-Martinez, based on the recurring element -eso- found in Lusitanian names.

== Significance ==
Blazquez-Martinez observed that while many deities were recorded in the Northern Lusitanian and Gallaecian regions, only Endovelicus, Ataegina, and Runesocesius appeared in the South, beyond the Tagus River. This has led some to suggest that particular importance was attached to these three. The character of the Celtici and other peoples in this region and their affiliation as Lusitanian, Celtic, or Tartessian/Turdetanian remains a complex issue. The name itself and its meaning remain subject to interpretation. C. Licinius Quinctinus' home in Balsa lay further South in what was, while part of the Roman province of Lusitania, outside the area of Lusitanian epigraphy and Lusitanian-Gallaecian theonyms, in the Tartessian or Turdetanian speaking part of the Iberian Peninsula. Runesocesius could therefore be seen as significant to the Lusitanians, Celtiberians, or Turdetani, or to all three.
