= Ialonus Contrebis =

Romano-Celtic god of the meadow and the settlement

Ialonus Contrebis, also Ialonus or Contrebis, was a god (or perhaps two related gods) of Romano-British and Gallo-Roman religion. He is known from three votive inscriptions of the Roman period, two from what is now Lancashire and a third from Nîmes in southern Gaul. The name Ialonus has been taken to designate a god of the meadow or cleared land, and Contrebis a god of the settled community.

== Name ==
Both names are of Celtic formation. The stem ialo- means 'cleared place' or 'clearing', and by extension 'village'. It is one of the commonest elements in Gallo-Roman place-names. Xavier Delamarre analyses the theonym as ialo-no-, a 'god of the clearing'. Ian Richmond rendered the name 'the god of the meadowland', Anne Ross 'god of the glade or lea', Paul-Marie Duval a god of the clearing or cultivated field, and Miranda Green a deity of the cultivated field or clearing. Delamarre takes its sense to reflect the way a settlement was made in the wooded Gaulish landscape, by clearing forest.

Contrebis is a compound of con- ('with, together') and treb- ('dwelling'). It has been read as 'he who dwells among us' and, as a group-name, 'of those who dwell together'. Richmond compared it with the Celtiberian place-name Contrebia, meaning 'conurbation'.

== Interpretation ==
Because no ancient author mentions the god, his character is inferred from his names and from the objects that accompany the dedications. Ialonus points to a deity of the cleared and cultivated land, and Contrebis to a guardian of the settled community. At Lancaster the two are joined in a single divine name, whereas at Overborough Contrebis is invoked on his own, and it is not certain whether one god or two related gods are meant.

Eric Birley adduced the mutilated altar from Nîmes as a parallel to the British Ialonus. Colette Bémont noted the same likeness between the Lancaster Ialonus and the Nîmes Ialona, but held that the scantiness of the evidence allows no more than the resemblance to be observed. Miranda Green treated the Nîmes Ialona as a female counterpart of the British god. Delamarre observes that the element -ialon, very common in the place-names of Gaul, is absent from those of Britain, which he takes to show that the word spread only late within Continental Celtic.

The Lancaster altar cannot be dated closely. Birley held that it need be no later than the 2nd century AD, since the common nomen Julius is not abbreviated, while Richmond preferred a 3rd-century date, when the ala Sebosiana cavalry regiment was in garrison at Lancaster.

== Epigraphy ==
The compound Ialonus Contrebis is named on a gritstone altar from Lancaster, set up by Julius Januarius, an emeritus and former decurion. It was found in 1802 in the digging of a lime-kiln beside a perennial spring to the north of the town, and is now in the Lancaster City Museum. A second altar, from Overborough at Kirkby Lonsdale, the site of the Roman fort of Galacum, is dedicated to Contrebis alone, by a man named Vatta. It is known only from an 18th-century drawing and is now lost.

On the Continent the name is recorded on a mutilated votive altar from Nîmes, in the territory of the Volcae Arecomici, which carries several dedications, one of them to a divinity read as the feminine Ialona or as Ialonus. The goddess Fortuna was there associated in popular devotion with this local deity.

Text	Find-spot	Divine name	Translation	Reference	Comments
Deo Ialono Contre(bi) sanctiss[i]mo Iuliu[s] Ianuarius em(eritus) ex dec(urione) v(otum) [s(olvit)]	Lancaster	Ialonus Contrebis	To the most holy god Ialonus Contrebis, Julius Januarius, emeritus, former decurion, fulfilled his vow.	RIB 600 (CIL VII, 284)	Gritstone altar, found in 1802 beside a spring north of Lancaster. Decorated with an axe on the left side and a knife on the right. Dated to the 2nd or 3rd century AD.
Deo san(cto) Contrebi Vatta posu(it)	Overborough (Galacum)	Contrebis	To the holy god Contrebis, Vatta set this up.	RIB 610 (CIL VII, 290)	Known only from an 18th-century drawing, now lost. Decorated with a bird, apparently an owl, on the right side, and a hatchet and knife on the left.
Ialon[...] et Fort[...]	Nîmes (Nemausus)	Ialona or Ialonus	Fragmentary.	CIL XII, 3057	Fragmentary and much restored. The theonym is read as the feminine Ialona or as Ialonus, and is paired with Fortuna. Territory of the Volcae Arecomici.

== See also ==
- Trebaruna
- Trebopala
