= Bandua =

Deity of pre-Roman Iberia

Bandue (previously recorded as Bandua) was a theonym used to refer to a god or goddess worshipped in Iberia by Callaeci and Lusitanians. Whether the name referred to a discrete deity or was an epithet applied to different deities is arguable.

== Name ==
This deity is variously attested as Bandi, Bandei, Bandu, Bandue, Banduae, Bandiae. The name is generally attested in the indigenous Galaico-Lusitanian inflection. Old scholarship usually recorded this theonym as Bandua due to misunderstanding by mistakenly considering that the theonym was recorded in Latin inflection.

=== Epigraphy ===
The deity's name is found, in epigraphy, with a series of epithets, totalling, as of 2025, 47 attestations (including its alternative spellings). Some of the epithets include:

- Bandei Brialeacui (Beira Baixa);
- Bandi Oilienaeco (Beira Alta);
- Bandi [L?]ongobricus (Longroiva);
- Bandua(e) Lansbricae (Orense);
- Bandi Roudaecus (Trujillo);
- Bandua Roudeaco (Madroñera);
- Deo Ban[du] (Catoira, Pontevedra);
- Bandue Ae[t]obrigo (Sarreaus, Ourense);
- Bandue Bolecco (Palas de Rei, Lugo);
- Bandue Veigebreago (Xinzo de Limia, Ourense);
- Bandue (Ve/Ni)rubrico (Laza, Ourense);
- Bandue Vorteaeco and variations, totalling 10 inscriptions.
- Bandi Haracui (Arronches).

In Rairiz de Veiga, Bandua is acknowledged as a god of the Vexillum and partner of Mars:

Deo Vexilor[um] martis socio Banduae

At Espinhosela, the name Bandua alone is found. At Codosedo, Alenquer and Xinzo de Limia however, the name Bandua is qualified by the epithet Aetobrico(m). At Cáceres, Bandua is qualified by Araugelensis, at Curbián by Bolleco(m), at Miguel o Anjo by Brico(m), at Mixo(m) by Calaigus, at La Mezquitilla by Itobrico(m), at Eiras by Lanobrica, at Rairiz de Veiga by Veigebreaeco(m), at Arcuelos by Verubrigo(m), at Seisco de Anciães by Vordeaeco(m) and at S. Martinho by Vorteaecio(m).

=== Extent of worship ===
The theonym Bandua has been found recorded in Portugal and Galicia. Along with Cosus, Nabia and Reo, Bandua is one of the best documented deities in large areas of western and north-western Iberia. Bandua is attested mostly in Ourense (six epigraphies from the Province of Ourense) and in Cáceres, indicating it was worshipped beyond Lusitania and in the western portion of Hispania.

It has been proposed that the worship of Bandua spread from the north (Callaecia and Asturia) into the south (Lusitania), along with that of Cosus and Nabia, so contrasting with the worship of Reo that would have extended in the opposite direction.

According to scholars Jürgen Untermann and Blanca María Prósper, the form Bandue, and the form Bandua or Banduae, predominate in the Galician territory north of the Douro River, while the Bandi ~ Bande form is more common in the Lusitanian area to the south.

Professor Olivares Pedreño argues that, in relation to the attestation of epithets Roudeaco/Roudaecus, the name pertains to a place named uicus Rouda, and their discovery in different locations suggests a migration or population displacement.

== Interpretations ==
=== Possible water deity ===
Bandua has been associated with water in order to explain the hydronym Banduje, in Portugal, or the toponym Banhos de Bande (a thermal spot whose medieval name, Vanate, is unrelated) and the proposed relationship of the name with fords.

Polish linguist Krzysztof Tomasz Witczak also sees some possible cognate relationship between Lusitanian Bandua and Illyrian god Bindus, a deity of water sources also equated to Roman Neptune.

=== Possible protective deity ===
Their epithets seem to allude more to dwelling places, at least those containing the element -briga or -bris, "fortress": Lanobrigae, Aetobrigo, than to the worshipping communities themselves. In the same vein, Olivares Pedreño, while calling Bandua a male deity, noted that their name is attested with place names (e.g., Etobrico, Brialeacui, Isibraiegui, Longobricu, Veigebreaego, Lansbricae), which seems to indicate its relation to ancient vici and castelle - locations distant from romanized population centers. In a later article by Olivares Pedreño, this association seems to highlight their connection with local indigenous communities, as their protector. In addition, according to researcher Daniela Ferreira, the most common interpretation of the deity in studies tends to consider Bandua as a tutelary or protective deity, etymologizing their name from PIE *bhendh- 'bind'.

=== Divine pair ===
The "location theory" has been criticized by de Bernardo Stempel, who interprets what have traditionally been considered singular thematic datives of male attributes as plural genitive forms referring to groups of people (B'andue Aetobrico(m), Cadogo(m), Roudeaeco(m), Veigebreaego(m)). She also states that they depend on a theonym, Bandua, which would be feminine as a consequence of the above, and which was probably created later than its masculine counterpart. Thus, we would have a pair of deities, Bandus (male) and Bandua (female), comparable to other Celtic pairs like Bormanos & Bormana, Belisama & Belisamaros, Camulos & Camuloriga and Arentius & Arentia.

=== Other interpretations ===
In a 2000 article, María Prósper offered another etymology: a reconstructed stem *bandu- would account for variations Bandue, Bandi and Bandei, ultimately deriving from Proto-Indo-European *gʷem-tu-. Thus, she argued, they are a deity of passageways, akin to Roman Ianus.

== Legacy ==
Researcher Ladislao Castro Pérez proposed that St. Torquatus, one of the Seven Apostolic Men responsible for the introduction of Christianity to Hispania, whose relics are kept in Santa Comba de Bande (Ourense), may be a Christian version of Bandua.

== See also ==
- Bandonga
- Bandus

== Bibliography ==
- De Bernardo Stempel, Patrizia (2003). "Los formularios teonímicos, Bandus con su correspondiente Femenino Bandua y unas isoglosas célticas". Conimbriga: Revista do Instituto de Arqueologia. 42: 197–213. doi:10.14195/1647-8657_42_7. ISSN 0084-9189..
- Olivares Pedreño, Juan Carlos (1999). "Dioses indígenas Vinculados a Núcleos De población En La Hispania Romana". Espacio, Tiempo y Forma. Serie II, Historia Antigua (12 (enero)): 325–350. doi:10.5944/etfii.12.1999.4360. hdl:10045/131609..
- Prósper, Blanca María (2000). "La divinidad galaico-lusitana BANDVE/BANDI y los dioses del pasaje del indoeuropeo occidental". AION: Annali del Istituto Orientale di Napoli. 20: 255–295..
- FERREIRA, Daniela. Os Deuses foram honrados. Porto: Faculdade de Letras da Universidade do Porto - FLUP, 2022. pp. 62-66.
