= Trebopala =

Trebopala is a Lusitanian name usually interpreted as a theonym, appearing on the Cabeço das Fraguas inscription from Portugal. Trebopala is probably a goddess.

== Meaning of the name ==
Although the name Trebopala appears in only a single inscription, it is of interest because this inscription is in the Lusitanian language rather than in a Latin dedication. It is generally thought the first element is a Celtic one, *trebo- (or a cognate with it) meaning a house or dwelling place. (Note: Antonio Tovar listed other cognates: Lithuanian trobà; Germanic thorp; Celtic tribal name Atrebates; Old Irish treb ('house'); Welsh tref ('homestead').) The second element is interpreted either as "protector", or as the attested Lepontic/Ligurian word pala, probably meaning a sacred stone, or as "flat land." Trebopala is therefore said to mean either Protector of the Home, Plain of the Home or Altar of the Home. In the inscription, Trebopala is recorded as receiving a single sheep (oilam).

== See also ==
- List of Lusitanian deities
- Trebaruna
- Reo
