= Bindus (Illyrian god) =

Mythological being

Bindus is a theonym attested in the territory of the Iapodes tribe. According to scholars, the name refers to a water deity worshipped by the Iapodes, since its name is attested next to Roman deity Neptune.

== Epigraphy ==
The name is attested in epigraphic monuments found in Dardanian territory, dated to the 2nd century, near the rivers Ibër and Drin. At least 11 votive documents dedicated to the deity were found in Privilica, Bihac:

- Bindo Neptuno sacrum
- B[i]ndo Neptuno sacr[um]
- (Bindo Nep)tuno
- Bindo N[e]ptuno sa[c]r(um)
- Bindo N(eptuno) s(acrum)
- [Bi]ndi
- Bi[ndo].

Out of the available epigraphy, four were dedicated by indigenous Romanized elites (praepositus), dated to Flavian times, and two offered by soldiers (dated to 3rd century).

A personal name Bindho was also found in a Noricum holy spring.

== Name and etymology ==
Linguists have connected the theonym to Old Cornish banne, Middle Cornish banna and Breton banne (all meaning 'drop'); Middle Irish buine 'water, stream' and Old Indic bindú- 'drop'.

Polish linguist Krzysztof Tomasz Witczak also sees some possible cognate relationship between the Illyrian deity and the Lusitanian Bandua.

Etymological connections have also been proposed between the deity's name and a place named fons Bandusiae, mentioned by Horatio in one of his Odes.

=== Interpretations ===
Bindus is interpreted as the name of a deity of seas and waters, or a deity of sources. In this regard, according to Croatian historian Aleksandar Stipčević, this interpretation is supported by the location of their altars at the source of a river in Privilica.

=== Iconography ===
An altar dedicated to Bindus shows its possible symbols: a figure is depicted with an oar and a dolphin on one side, and a triton with an oar on the other side.

== See also ==
- Illyrian religion

== Bibliography ==
- Cambi, Nenad (2022) [2013]. "Romanization of the Western Illyricum from Religious Point of View". Godišnjak Centra Za balkanološka Ispitivanja. 42 (42): 71–88. doi:10.5644/Godisnjak.CBI.ANUBiH-42.22.
- Dzino, Danijel (2009). "Bindus Neptunus: Hybridity, acculturation and the display of power in the hinterland of Roman Dalmatia". Histria Antiqua. 18 (1): 355–362.
- Ferri, Naser (2012). "Vjerovanja i štovanje bogova u predkršćanskoj Dardaniji" [Cults and Beliefs in Pre-Christian Dardania]. Godišnjak Centra za balkanološka ispitivanja (in Bosnian) (41). Akademija Nauka i Umjetnosti Bosne i Hercegovine: 135–158. doi:10.5644/Godisnjak.CBI.ANUBiH-40.8.
- Huseinović, Edin (2022). "The valley of the Una river, the land of the "Illyrian" Iapodes". Godišnjak Udruženja BATHINVS "Acta Illyrica". 6: 157–189. doi:10.54524/2490-3930.2022.157.
- Katičić, Radoslav (1972). "Drei Altbalkanische Nomina Sacra" [Three Old-Balkan Nomina Sacras]. Godišnjak Centra za balkanološka ispitivanja (in German) (9): 126–127.
