= Duberdicus =

Duberdicus or Duberdico, is a Lusitanian theonym, in the cultural area of Lusitania (in the territory of modern Portugal). It has historically been assumed that this was a water god, but Jorge de Alarcão disagrees with this assertion (as well as several other alleged cases of water deities in the Lusitanian sphere). He assumes that it is a theonym associated with a specific fortress.

== See also ==
- List of Lusitanian deities
- Lusitanian mythology
