= Aernus =

Name of a god in the Lusitanian and Gallaecian pantheons

Aernus was a theonym used for a god in the Lusitanian and Gallaecian pantheons. The use of this theonym was confined to worship in the vicinity of Bragança. Around this area, a number of inscriptions to a god hailed by this name have been recorded. One inscription, found in Castro de Avelãs, Bragança, was dedicated by the ‘ordo Zoelarum,’ and this leads Tranoy and Roux to conclude that this god was probably the protector of the Zoelae. Another inscription was also found in Castro de Avelãs, while yet another was found in Malta in Macedo de Cavaleiros, also in the District of Bragança. While epigraphic evidence for Aernus is scarce, its concentration in a reduced territory in association with homogeneous aspects of material culture indicates to Olivares a homogeneity in the cultural area of the Zoelae. The meaning of the name is still unknown but compare the Proto-Indo-European roots *aper- ‘behind, at the back’ and *āpero- ‘bank’ with the regular phonological developments in Celtic.
