= Fountain of the Idol =

Roman fountain in São José de São Lázaro, Braga, Portugal

- Fonte do Ídolo
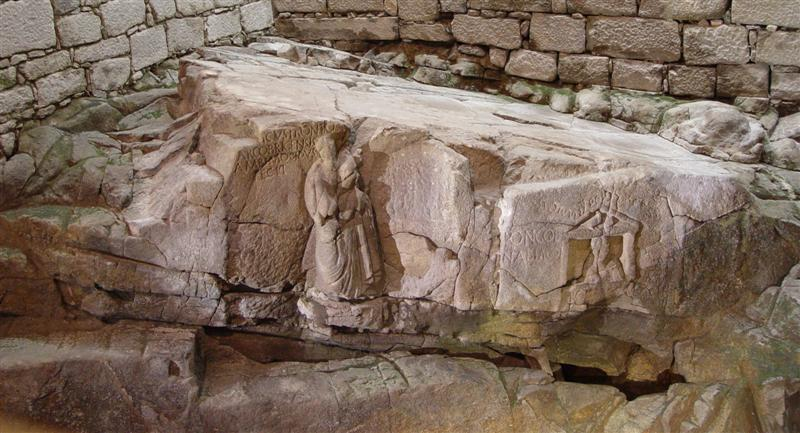
- The fountain of the Idol, showing the two figures representing Lusitanian gods
- Artist: Célico Fronto
- Year: 1st Century A.D.
- Medium: Granite
- Location: São José de São Lázaro, Braga; 41°32′54.97″N 8°25′19.03″W
- Owner: Portuguese Republic

The Fountain of the Idol (Portuguese: Fonte do Ídolo) is a Roman fountain located in the civil parish of São José de São Lázaro, in the municipality of Braga, northern Portugal. Located in the former territory of the Callaici Bracari, the granite rock fountain/spring has Latin inscriptions, dedicated to the Gallaecian and Lusitanian gods Tongoenabiagus and Nabia (built during the era of Roman Emperor Augustus).

== History ==
The construction of the fountain probably began in the 1st century, associated with a water cult, dedicated to the Lusitanian divinity Tongoenbiagus, and ordered constructed by Celicus Fronto.

=== Kingdom ===
First identified by Georg Braun in his map of Braga in 1594, the document indicated the location of the spring (marked by a channel of water).

By 1695, the land on which the fountain is located was owned by Father Santos Rodrigues, vicar of São João de Castelões, in Guimarães. On his death, his property passed to his niece, D. Angélica de Barros, who later bequeathed it to her brother-in-law Vicente Gomes do Couto.

In the 18th century, the accountant D. Jerónimo Contador de Argote, noted in his records: "behind the church of São João Marcos is a garden, that is called "Idol", in which is located a deep spring, which has a rock, which appears to be living rock, with a figure in long robes, that is five palms [in size]: it looks like [the figure] has a long beard, and part of his body is missing; his right hand is broken and on the left the form of a envolotório, and above the head there are letters..." Jerónimo recounts with this detailed description, a design of the fountain of the Idol that was first created by the Bishop of Urianópolis, Alves de Figueire.

Domingos Fernandes da Silva attempted to acquire the lands judicially, under the pretext that the lands were part of his property in 1816.

On 6 August 1861, Emílio Hübner visited the garden of the Idol, informed that name of the divinity was obscured by lime, and attempted to correct the inscription, following the notes of D. Jerónimo.

A year later, King Pedro V and the marquess of Sousa examine the fountain, then offered to the monarch as a gift by its owner João de Abreu Guedes do Couto. The King wanted to remove it and install it on the grounds of Quinta dos Falcões, as a base of a lapidary museum, but desisted.

Around the 1870s, the fountain was sold to Luís do Amaral Ferreira, then known as o Alemão (the German), but later passed into the hands of Maria do Carmo Sousa, wife of Luís do Amaral Ferreira (in 1875). By the 1890s, the fountain was the property of José Joaquim de Oliveira, who married Maria do Carmo Sousa.

By 1894, José Leite de Vasconcelos visited the Idol's garden, and completed a study of the structure (in a letter date 27 March 1894 to Martins Sarmento). Martins Sarmento, for his part, was interested in creating a mould of the fountain for the Museum of the Sociedade Martins Sarmento, in Guimarães. Leite de Vasconcelos returned a year later to Braga, in order to examine the inscriptions, which had by then become covered in lime: he rectified the obscurity of some of the inscription, re-reading TONGOE rather than PONGOE. Leite de Vasconcelos made return visits in 1903 and 1905 to study the fountain further, hypothesizing that the human figure on the left was the religious practitioner and the image within the structure the divinity.

=== Republic ===
In 1936, the municipal government of Braga, under its president Francisco Araújo Malheiro, acquired the land surrounding the fountain. But, they transferred this title to the State the following year, including the fountain, the surrounding lands and access along Rua do Raio: the Direcção Geral dos Edifícios e Monumentos Nacionais (DGMEN) then demolished the public tank, water pipes, encountered an imbrex and tegula and votive inscription. Subsequent repairs occurred in 1952, while access to the space was developed in 1967.

In 1980-1981, Alain Tranoy, reassessing Leite de Vasconcelos' original hypothesis, suggested that the left figure on the idol was the divinity, while the enclosed figure the practitioner/devotee. Later, António Rodríguez Colmenero defended that the fountain was part of plural sanctuary, and the figures represented the figures of Nabia and Tongo Nabiago.

In 1995, a conservation study of the fountain was undertaken by professors Maria Amélia Sequeiro Braga and Luís Aires de Barros. It was followed in 1999 by an archaeological investigation of the surrounding area, and a 2000-2001, project by architect Paula Silva, in collaboration with Carla Pestana and João Ferreira, to construct a building to preserve the site and act as interpretative centre.

In September 2002, a public tender process offered the project to Casimiro Ribeiro e Filhos, Lda. and CARI-Guimarães. It was followed in 2003 by a formal excavation by the Archaeology department of the Universidade do Minho, coordinated by Francisco Sande Lemos and José Manuel Freitas Leite, with the collaboration of Liliana Sampaio, Sandra Nogueira, Ricardo Silva and Artur Jaime Duarte, who were responsible for the discovering drainage canals and Roman wall structures. At the same time, in 2003, the Universidade do Minho was responsible for cleaning of the rocks and clearing the vegetation, developing a humidity-controlled environment with reception area. On the conclusion of the construction project, in 2004, the site fell under the authority of the DGEMN, the municipal government of Braga, the Universidade do Minho and the D. Diogo de Sousa Regional Museum, through a protocol between the identified parties. In 2005, the municipality of Braga was conceded the operational control of the site for a period of 25 years, and on 11 January 2006 the interpretative pavilion was inaugurated.

== Architecture ==
The fountain is a large granite surface, forming an elongated backrest, measuring about 3 metres wide and 1.20 metres high. On the left of the rock is a carved human figure, about 1.10 metres tall, upright, but deteriorated, and possibly male with a beard, wrapped in a toga, holding in his left arm a bulky object. It is flanked above by Latin inscription, the first word partially cut into the stone. To the right of the figure (just slightly below) is a rectangular building cut into the rock, about 0.7 metres high, 0.6 metres wide and 0.12 deep, with the worn figure of human head. The little house is crowned by a triangular pediment with a bird engraved into its triangular form, while other Latin inscriptions are engraved into its sides, extending to the base. At the base of this granite structure flows the fountain's water.

The fountain is enclosed in a modernist structure built to protect and act as an interpretive centre, within the historical centre of Braga, near the Palace of Raio and Hospital of São Marcos.

The monument is located outside of the former urban perimeter of Bracara Augusta (modern day Braga), and whose many epigraphic inscriptions permits a clear association between it and the local religious divinity at the time: Tongoenabiagus, which was associated with the goddess Nabia in Lusitanian mythology.

A few indicators suggest that there may have existed, in the same location, another structure, likely a temple to the goddess Nabia (as yet undiscovered). The figure in the toga could represent the god Asclepius. Francisco Sande Lemos, suggests that the fountain was paired with the sanctuary of Fragas de Panóias in Vila Real, one of the more familiar monuments of Roman rock-art epigraphy in the Iberian northwest.

=== Inscriptions ===
The inscription above the main figure (Latin: ICVUS FRONTO ARCOBRIGENSIS AMBIMOGIDVS FECIT) states that Celicus Fronto, native of Arcobriga, Ambimogido, made this work, although a portion of the first part of the phrase of missing. To the right of the enclosed figure, and continuing to the base the inscription (Latin: CELICVS FECIT) declares Celicus made this work. Alongside the house the inscription (Latin: TONGOE NABIAGOI), indicating the spelling of the divinity Tongoenabiagus, while above the same engraving (Latin: ABAVIS AMOR) statingwith affection from the great-grandparents.

A comparable stone from the old Chapel of Santana, which once existed near the source of the fountain (and now in the archbishops Palace), with an inscription alluding to the restoration of the structure; the inscription reads "T CAELICVS IPIP FRONT ET M ET LVCIVS TITIPRONEPOTES CAELICI Fronton RENO RVN (VA)", or specifically T. Caelicus Fronto, and Mark, Titus and Lucius, grandchildren and great-grandchildren of Caelicus Fronto restored.

== See also ==
- Castro culture
- Pre-Roman peoples of the Iberian Peninsula
