= Trebaruna =

Lusitanian deity

Trebaruna, also Treborunnis and possibly *Trebarunu, was a Lusitanian deity, probably a goddess. Trebaruna's cult was located in the cultural area of Gallaecia and Lusitania (in the territory of modern Galicia (Spain) and Portugal).

== Names ==
Her name also appears as Trebarune, Trebaronna, Trebarone, Trebaronne and Trebaroni.

Spanish historian José María Blázquez Martínez also lists the following name attestations for the deity:

- Trebarona (Coria)
- Trebarune (Findão)
- Trebaroune (Lardosa)
- Trebarouna (Idanha-a-Nova)
- Triborunni (Cascais)
- Debaroni muceaicaeco (Aveledas)

=== Etymology ===
Her name could be derived from the Celtic *trebo ('home') and *runa ('secret, mystery'). Spanish philologist Antonio Tovar suggested that, like the first part of name Trebopala, this goddess could have been connected to the community. Jürgen Untermann states that the names of this deity are found in the dative case, suggesting a nominative form like *Trebaru or *Trebaro.

== Epigraphic evidence ==
Tovar listed three inscriptions wherein their name is attested: one from Idanha-a-Velha, a second from Coria and the third from Lardosa.

Two small altars dedicated to this goddess were found in Portugal, one in Roman-Lusitanian Egitania (current Idanha-a-Velha) and another in Lardosa. The Tavares Proença Regional Museum in Castelo Branco now contains the altar from Lardosa. It was located in an area where the people from a Castro settlement founded a Roman-Lusitanian villa. This altar used to hold a statue of the goddess which has since been lost. Nevertheless, it still preserves this inscription: TREBARONNE V(otum) S(Olvit) OCONUS OCONIS f(ilius) which translates as: Oconus, son of Oco, has fulfilled the vow to Trebaruna.

A name Trebarune (probably in the dative case) also appears on the inscription of Cabeço das Fráguas as a divinity receiving a sacrifice of a sheep.

In an inscription from Fundão in Portugal, a deity Trebarune is invoked by a Toncius Toncetani:

Ara(m) pos(uit) Toncius Toncetani f(ilius) Icaedit(anus) milis Trebarun(a)e l(ibens) m(erito) v(otum) s(olvit)

José d'Encarnação lists an inscription from the Roman villa of Freiria (Cascais) (found on August 27, 1985), where a Triborunnis is invoked - a possible reference to this deity. The component Tribo- he interprets as cognate to PIE *treb-.

A more recent inscription from Capera is a dedicatory epigraphy by a person named Marcus Fidius to Augusta Trebaruna.

Daniela Ferreira suggests that Beira Baixa is the deity's original area of worship, given the "concentration" of epigraphies in Beira Baixa.

== Possible role ==
José Leite de Vasconcellos suggested that Trebaruna was a war goddess, since he found a second votive altar by the same person (Toncius Toncetami), dedicated to Roman goddess Victoria.

Based on a possible etymology of her name, it seems she was a protector or protectress of property, home, and families. In the same vein, Olivares Pedreños cited positions by d'Arbois de Jubainville and Lambrino that interpret her as a protectress of the group or tribe.

== Legacy ==
Following the announcement in 1895 by José Leite de Vasconcelos of the discovery of Trebaruna as a new theonym, a poem celebrating this was published which likened Trebaruna to the Roman Victoria. She has recently become, among neopagans, a goddess of battles and alliances. The Portuguese metal-band Moonspell composed a song called "Trebaruna" which is a celebration of the goddess.

== See also ==
- List of Lusitanian deities
- Lusitanian mythology

== Bibliography ==
- Mora, Noelia Cases (2021). "Inscripción dedicada a Augusta Trebaruna en Capera (Oliva de Plasencia, Cáceres)". Boletín del Archivo Epigráfico. 7: 68–75. ISSN 2603-9117..
- Prósper, Blanca (1994). "El teónimo paleohispano Trebarune". Veleia. 11. Vitoria-Gasteiz: 187–196. ISSN 0213-2095..
- FERREIRA, Daniela. Os Deuses foram honrados. Porto: Faculdade de Letras da Universidade do Porto - FLUP, 2022. pp. 58-61.
