= Dercetius =

Dercetius was a mountain god in Lusitanian mythology, in the cultural area of Gallaecia and Lusitania (in the territory of modern Galicia and Extremadura (Spain) and Portugal). Inscriptions dedicated to him have been found near Braga (Bracara Augusta, the Roman capital of Gallaecia).
