= Sahā =

In Mahāyāna Buddhism, the mundane world

Translations of Sahā
- Sanskrit: सहा (IAST: Sahā)
- Pali: सह (Saha)
- Chinese: 娑婆 (Pinyin: Suōpó)
- Japanese: 娑婆 (Rōmaji: Shaba)
- Korean: 사바 (RR: Saba)
- Tibetan: མི་འཇེད་འཇིག་རྟེན་ Wylie: mi 'jed 'jig rten
- Vietnamese: Sa bà

Sahā or more formally the Sahā world (Sanskrit: sahāloka or sahālokadhātu) in Mahāyāna Buddhism refers to the mundane world, essentially the sum of existence that is other than nirvana.

It is the entirety of conditioned phenomena, also referred to as the trichiliocosm. As a term, its usage is comparable to the Earth (pṛthivī) or as the place where all beings are subject to the cycle of birth and death (saṃsāra). It is the place where both good and evil manifests and where beings must exercise patience and endurance (kṣānti). It is also described as the place where Śākyamuni Buddha teaches the Dharma.

The Sahā world is divided into three distinct realms or worlds (traidhātuka or trailokya).

Its ruler is Mahābrahmā Sahāmpati.

== Etymology ==
Sahā is a Sanskrit term meaning "together" or "enduring."

Chinese texts sometimes translate the term as 忍土 (pinyin: Rěntǔ), literally "land of endurance."

== Composition ==
=== Realm of Desire ===
The desire realm (kāmadhātu) is where all sentient beings consist of a physical body and are susceptible to the experience of sense faculties. These beings are generally composed of 18 elements (dhātu), that include the sense bases and their respective modes of consciousness.

In Buddhist cosmology, the desire realm is often described as being composed of four continents (cāturdvīpaka) which surround Mount Sumeru, which itself is surrounded by oceans and mountain ranges. The four continents are

- Jambudvīpa in the South
- Pūrvavideha in the East
- Uttarakuru in the North
- Avaragodānīya in the West

== As a Pure Land ==
The Vimalakirti Sutra further elaborates on the nature of the Sahā world. It is treated as a pure land of its own, under the jurisdiction of Śākyamuni Buddha. It has ten features distinct from other pure lands:

1. The poor are attracted by charity
2. The transgressors are attracted by pure precepts
3. The angry are attracted by forbearance
4. The lazy are attracted by exertion
5. The perturbed are attracted by meditation
6. The foolish are attracted by wisdom
7. Those who experience the eight difficulties are saved by explanation of how to eliminate difficulties
8. Those who take pleasure in the Hinayana are saved by the teaching of the Mahayana
9. Those without merit may be saved by the various good roots
10. The liberation of sentient beings is constantly being accomplished by means of the four attractions

== See also ==
- Buddhist cosmology
- Trailokya
- Saṃsāra (Buddhism)
- Sahā Triad
