= Ares Lusitani =

Lusitanian mythological figure

Ares Lusitani (Latin for the Lusitanian Ares) was the god of horses and knights in Lusitanian mythology, in the cultural area of Gallaecia and Lusitania (in the territory of modern Galicia (Spain) and Portugal). This deity was probably a late Greek-Roman addition to the native pantheon.
