= Theban Triad =

Three most revered gods of the ancient Egyptian city of Thebes

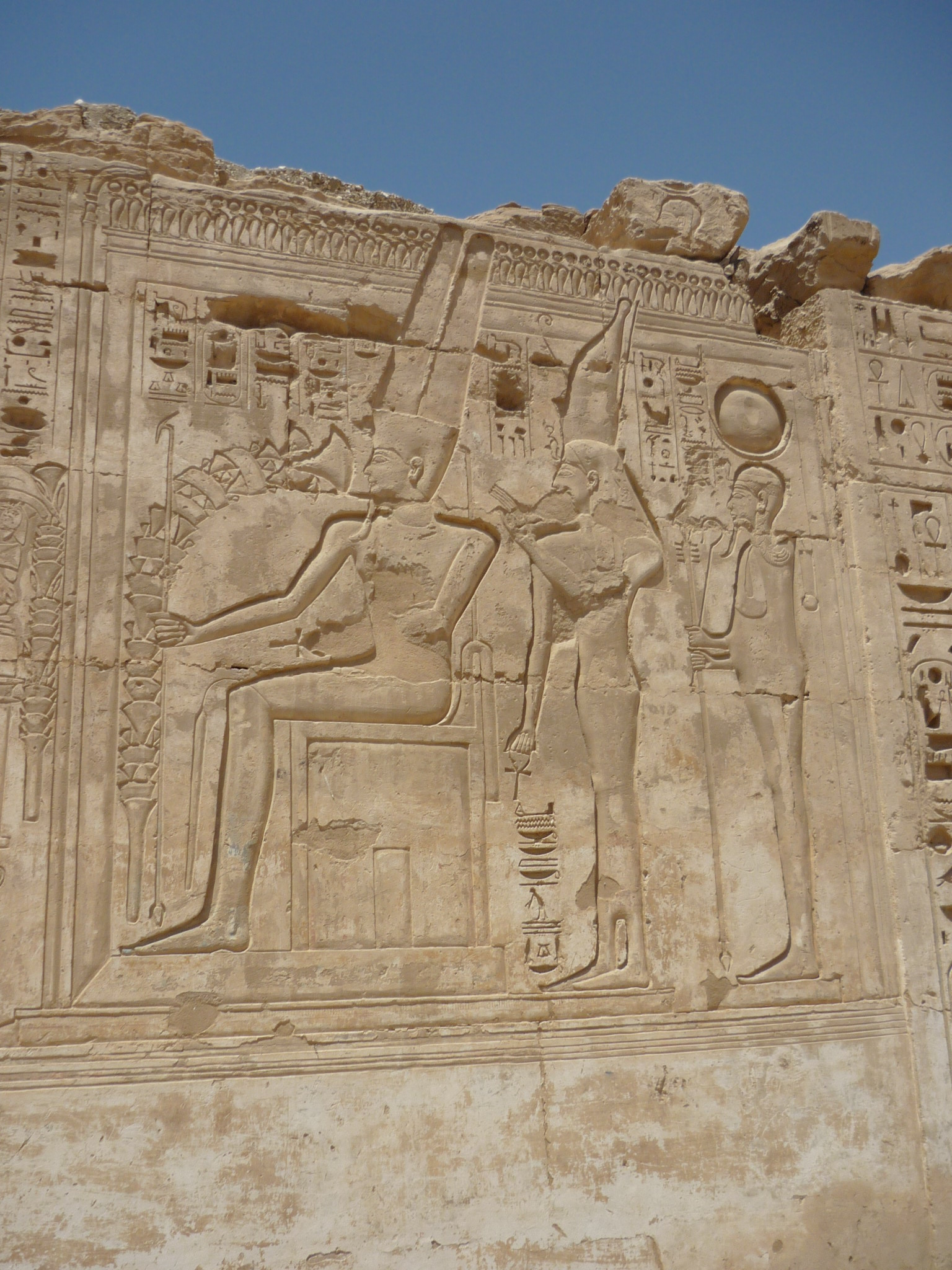
The Theban Triad depicted at Medinet Habu. From left to right: Amun, Mut and Khonsu

The Theban Triad is a triad of Egyptian gods most popular in the area of Thebes, Egypt.

== The triad ==
The group consisted of Amun, his consort Mut and their son Khonsu.

Despite originally being a part of the Ogdoad, the triad were favored by both the 18th and 25th Dynasty. At the vast Karnak Temple Complex, these gods constituted the primary objects of worship. Other temples and shrines also exist throughout Egypt, such as the one at Deir el-Hagar, close to the Dakhla Oasis. Amenhotep I, the pharaoh who built Karnak, was often depicted amongst these gods.
