= Tongoenabiagus =

1st-century shrine in Braga, Portugal

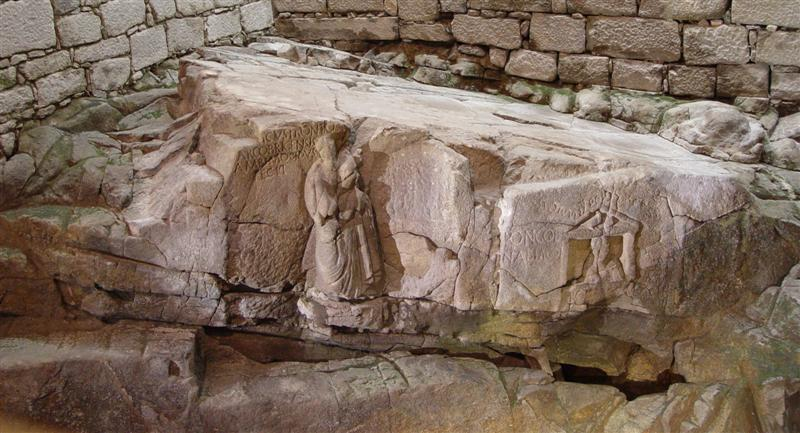
The Fonte do Ídolo, in Braga.

Tongoenabiagus was the god of the Fonte do Ídolo (Portuguese for Fountain of the Idol), a 1st-century shrine in Braga (the Roman Bracara Augusta) with an inscribed fountain dedicated both to Tongoenabiagus and the goddess Nabia. His name may derive from the Celtic root *tenge(o)- (Old Irish tongu "I swear") and so he may have been associated with the swearing of oaths.

== See also ==
- Castro culture
- Pre-Roman peoples of the Iberian Peninsula
