= Sahā Triad =

Devotional motif in East Asian Buddhist art

The Sahā Triad or Three Saints of the Saha World (娑婆三聖, pinyin: suōpó sānshèng) is a devotional motif in East Asian Buddhist art. It represents the chief Buddha and bodhisattvas of the Sahā World:

- Śākyamuni Buddha
- Avalokiteśvara bodhisattva, often depicted in the form of Guanyin
- Kṣitigarbha bodhisattva

The figures are usually presented such that Buddha is in the middle with Guanyin to the Buddha's left (that is on the viewer's right) and Kṣitigarbha on the Buddha's right.

== Summary ==
The Sahā Triad is a relatively recent development in Buddhist art and is particularly popular in Taiwan. Although largely affiliated with the Tzu Chi Foundation, it has spread among the broader circle of Chinese Buddhism.

Chapter 12 of the Kṣitigarbha Sūtra provides an episode in which all these of these figures are present:

The Buddha told Avalokiteśvara,

"Kṣitigarbha Bodhisattva has great affinity with [the sentient beings of] Jambudvīpa. To state all the ways that sentient beings can benefit from seeing his images, hearing his name, and worshipping him, it cannot be completed even after hundreds of thousands of kalpas.

Hence, Avalokiteśvara, you should use your divine power to circulate this Sutra, enabling sentient beings in the Sahā World to receive blessings for tens of billions of kalpas."
