= Ulaca =

Iron Age hillfort in present-day Spain

Coordinates: 40°31′49″N 4°53′1″W

Ulaca was a hill fort settlement or oppidum (also known as a castro) where Vettones people lived at the end of the Iron Age (third–first centuries BC). Some ruins are visible after archaeological excavations have taken place. It is located in the municipality of Solosancho in the province of Ávila in Spain.

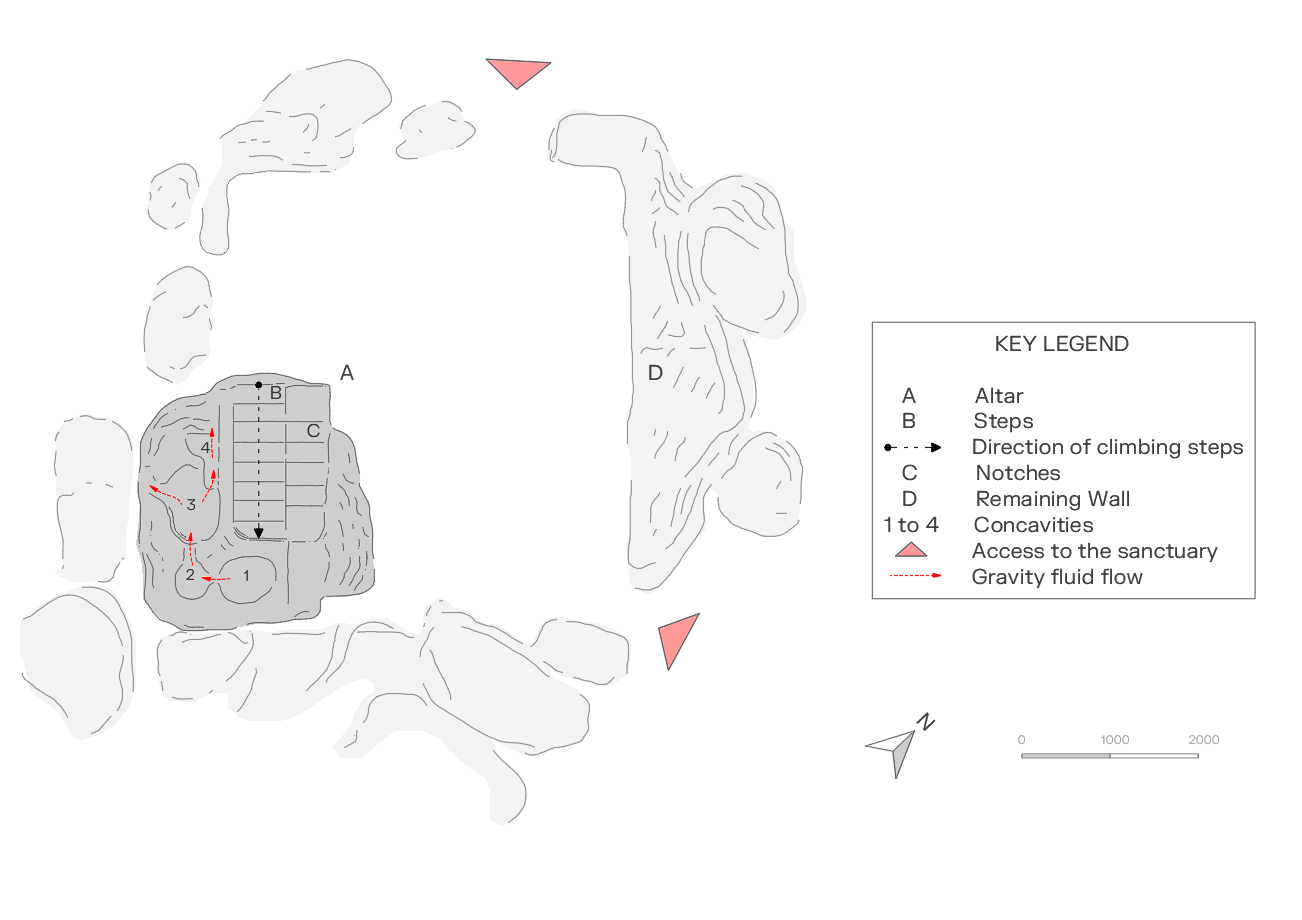
The 16m by 8m sanctuary with two entries from the South-West. Some 2m enclosure walls (D) still remain. In the corner there is an Altar (A) with steps (B) to climb it and notches (C). Note the concavities (1–4) to allow the fluid to flow.

The oppidum was enclosed by a 3,000 m long wall, leaving an oval-shaped inner area of more than 60 ha. Archaeological excavations in the inner part of the oppidum revealed the stone foundations of more than 250 houses. By taking into account the number of houses found, the extension of the settlement and the cemetery findings, the estimated population of the castro was between 1,000 and 1,400 inhabitants, making one of the largest settlements in the region at that time.

In the northwest area of the settlement, set apart from the houses, a sanctuary is located. The sanctuary was a space partially carved into the rock. Originally had a size of 16m by 8m with two entries from the Southeast and from the West. There are remaining parts of the enclosing stone walls that have a height of 2 meters, but large stones lie on the ground in the areas where the walls have collapsed. This sanctuary is associated with a large rock on which an altar was carved, with a slope on three of its four sides. On the north-facing side, two sets of parallel steps were carved with six and nine steps that lead to a flat area on the top of the rock, where there are connected concavities which are connected between them, being able to pour each other, allowing liquids to reach the bottom of the altar when poured from the concavity at the top.
