= Lusitanian language =

Extinct Indo-European language of Iberia

Lusitanian
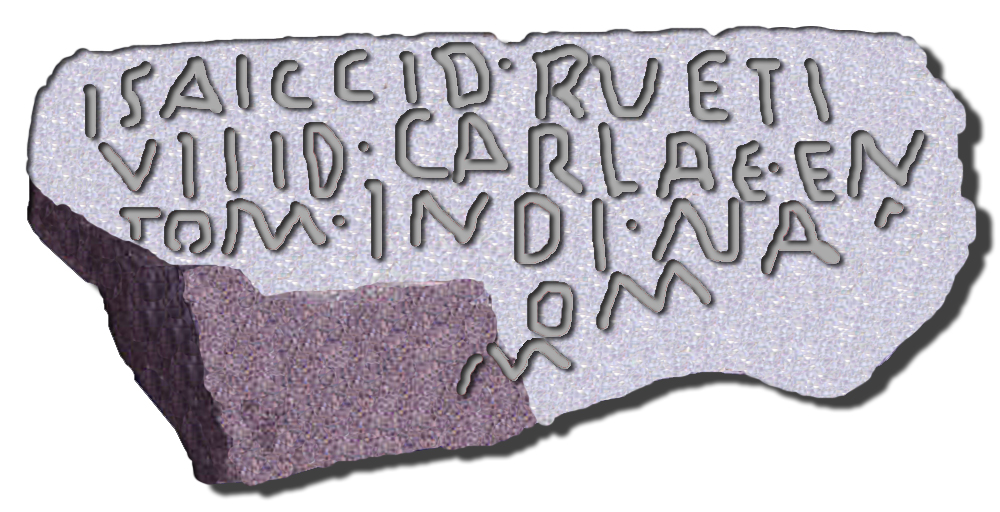
- One of the inscriptions of Arroyo de la Luz
- Native to: Inland central-west Iberian Peninsula
- Region: Beira Alta, Beira Baixa and Alto Alentejo Portugal and Extremadura and part of province of Salamanca Spain
- Extinct: 2nd century AD
- Language family: Indo-European: Italo-Celtic?; Celtic or Italic (?) or Para-Celtic (?); Lusitanian

Language codes
- ISO 639-3: xls
- Glottolog: lusi1235
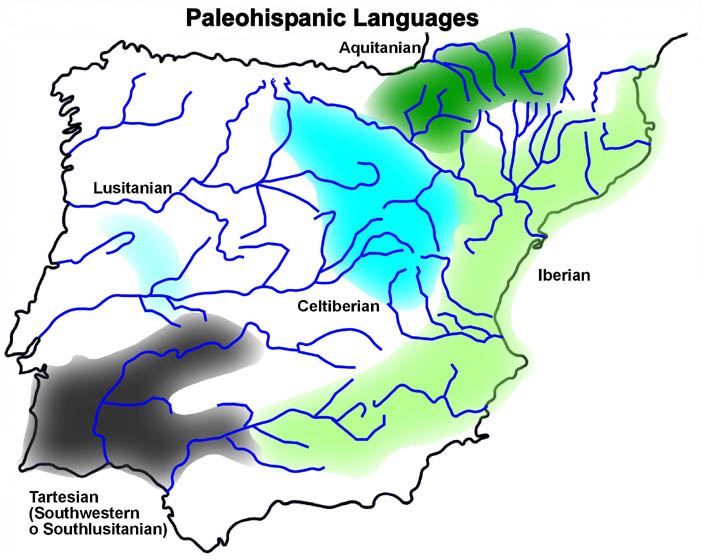
- Lusitanian language in the context of paleohispanic languages

Lusitanian (so named after the Lusitani or Lusitanians) is an extinct Indo-European Paleohispanic language. There has been support for either a connection with the Celtic languages and sometimes with the Italic languages. It is known from only six sizeable inscriptions, dated to roughly the first century AD, and numerous names of places (toponyms) and of gods (theonyms). The language was spoken in the territory inhabited by Lusitanian tribes, between the Douro and Tagus rivers, territory that today falls in central Portugal and western Spain.

== Classification ==
In spite of the limited corpus, the Lusitanian inscriptions are linked by several recurring words, which enabled the establishment of Lusitanian as a linguistic entity. The number of semantically clear words is minimal. Three words for sacrificial animals are clearly identified (porcom 'pig, pork', taurom 'bull', oilam 'sheep, lamb').

Lusitanian has undergone the same centum development as all Western Indo-European languages (e.g. porcom from *pork̑om). Furthermore, evidence for the fate of labiovelars is arguable. It has been suggested that, unlike in other centum languages, PIE *kʷ and *ku̯/ḱu̯ did not merge, but rather that *kʷ became Lus. ⟨p⟩ and *ku̯/ḱu̯ remained as Lus. ⟨qu⟩ (Prósper 2002:396−397; Witczak 2005: 274−276). The sibilant s generally remains in Lusitanian but is dropped on occasion in final position (Stifter 2010−2011: 189−190).

=== Celtic ===
Scholars like Untermann (1987) identify toponymic and anthroponymic radicals which are clearly linked to Celtic materials: briga 'hill, fortification', bormano 'thermal' (compare the theonym Bormo), karno 'cairn', krouk 'hillock, mound', crougia 'monument, stone altar', etc. Others, like Anderson (1987), point to results of inscriptional comparisons between Lusitania and Gallaecia that they argue show, somewhat indirectly, that Lusitanian and Gallaecian formed a fairly homogeneous linguistic group. Indigenous divine names in Portugal and Galicia frequently revolve around the gods or goddesses Bandu (or Bandi), Cossu, Nabia and Reve:

- Bandei Brialcacui (Beira-Baixa)
- Coso Udaviniago (A Coruña)
- Cosiovi Ascanno (Asturias)
- deo domeno Cusu Neneoeco (Douro)
- Reo Paramaeco (Lugo)
- Reve Laraucu (Ourense)
- Reve Langanidaeigui (Beira-Baixa)

The Lusitanian and Gallaecian divine name Lucubos, for example, also occurs outside the peninsula, in the plural, in Celtic Helvetia, where the nominative form is Lugoves. Reflecting the corresponding singular form, an ancient Celtic god Lugus is also attested. Lug was also an Irish god, and the ancient name of Lyon was Lug(u)dunum and may have a connection with the Lusitanian and Gallaecian word, suggesting therefore a north-western Iberian sprachbund with Lusitanian as a dialect, not a language isolate. Ellis Evans believes that Gallaecian-Lusitanian were one same language (not separate languages) of the “P” Celtic variant.

While chronology, migrations and diffusion of Hispanic Indo-European peoples are still far from clear, it has been argued there is a case for assuming a shared Celtic dialect for ancient Portugal and Galicia-Asturias. Linguistic similarities between these Western Iberian Indo-Europeans, the Celtiberians, the Gauls and the Celtic peoples of Great Britain indicate an affiliation in vocabulary and linguistic structure.

Furthermore, scholars such as Koch say there is no unambiguous example of the reflexes of the Indo-European syllabic resonants *l̥, *r̥, *m̥, *n̥ and the voiced aspirate stops *bʱ, *dʱ, *ɡʱ. Additionally, names in the inscriptions can be read as undoubtedly Celtic, such as AMBATVS, CAELOBRIGOI and VENDICVS. Dagmar Wodtko argues that it is hard to identify Lusitanian personal or place-names that are actually not Celtic. These arguments contradict the hypothesis that the p- in PORCOM alone excludes Lusitanian from the Celtic group of pre-Roman languages of Europe and that it can be classed as a Celtic dialect but one that preserved Indo-European *p (or possibly an already phonetically weakened [ɸ], written P as an archaism). This is based largely on numerous Celtic personal, deity, and place names.

Lusitanian possibly shows /p/ from Indo-European *kʷ in PVMPI, pronominal PVPPID from *kʷodkʷid, and PETRANIOI derived from *kʷetwor- 'four', but that is a feature found in many Indo-European languages from various branches (including P-Celtic/Gaulish, Osco-Umbrian, and partially in Germanic where it subsequently evolved into /f/, but notably not Celtiberian), and by itself, it has no bearing on the question of whether Lusitanian is Celtic. Bua Carballo suggests that pairings on different inscriptions such as Proeneiaeco and Proinei versus Broeneiae, and Lapoena versus Laboena, may cast doubt on the presence of a P sound in Lusitanian.

David Stifter (2018) proposes that Lusitano-Galician was a dialect continuum which also shared linguistic elements with neighbouring Celtiberian. The only inscriptions found in the old Lusitanian territories do not provide enough evidence for the debate about whether this was a Celtic, Italic, or a much older language which pre-dates any of the European language-groups. Like in Celtiberian, adjectival formations in -k- (-iko-, -aiko-, -tiko-) display rich productivity, e.g. teucaecom ← teucom, lamaticom 'belonging to L.' ← placename *Lama. Derivatives in -i̯ o/ā- are also frequent (e.g. usseam <*ups-ii̯ā- or *uts-ii̯ā-?). There are compounds that consist of two nominal elements; others are made up of preverb + nominal element, but the exact formal and semantic types cannot be determined.

=== Para-Celtic ===
Several scholars have proposed that it may be a para-Celtic language, which evolved alongside Celtic or formed a dialect continuum or a sprachbund with Tartessian and Gallaecian. This is tied to a theory of an Iberian origin for the Celtic languages. It is also possible that the Q-Celtic languages alone, including Goidelic, originated in western Iberia (a theory that was first put forward by Welsh historian Edward Lhuyd in 1707) or shared a common linguistic ancestor with Lusitanian.

=== Non-Celtic ===
In general, philologists believe that Lusitanian was an Indo-European language but not Celtic.

Witczak (1999) is highly critical of the name-correspondences of Lusitanian and Celtic by Anderson (1985) and Untermann (1987), describing them as "unproductive" and agrees with Karl Horst Schmidt that they are insufficient proof of a genetic relationship because they could have come from language contact [with Celtic]. He concludes that Lusitanian is an Indo-European language, likely of a western but non-Celtic branch, as it differs from Celtic speech by some phonological phenomena, e.g. in Lusitanian Indo-European *p is preserved but Indo-European *d is changed into r; Common Celtic, on the contrary, retains Indo-European *d and loses *p.

Villar and Pedrero (2001) propose a connection between Lusitanian and contemporaneous ancient Ligurian, which was spoken mostly in north-west Italy, between the Gaulish and Etruscan sprachraums). There are two major, unresolved problems with this hypothesis. Firstly, Ligurian remains unclassified and is usually considered to be either Celtic or "Para-Celtic", which does not resolve the question of dissimilarities between Lusitanian and canonical Celtic languages (including Iberoceltic). Secondly, the hypothesis is based partly on shared grammatical elements, parallels in theonyms and possible cognate lexemes, between Lusitanian and third languages that have no known connection to Ligurian, such as Umbrian, an Italic language. (Villar and Pedrero report possible cognates including e.g. Lusitanian comaim and Umbrian gomia.)

Jordán Colera (2007) does not consider Lusitanian or more broadly Gallo-Lusitanian, as a Celtic corpus, although he claims it has some Celtic linguistic features.

According to Prósper (1999), Lusitanian cannot be considered a Celtic language under existing definitions of linguistic celticity because, along with other non-Celtic features, it retains Indo-European *p in positions where Celtic languages would not, specifically in PORCOM 'pig' and PORGOM. More recently, Prósper (2021) has confirmed her earlier readings of inscriptions with the help of a newly discovered inscription from Plasencia, pointing to the morphs of the dative and locative endings that clearly separate Lusitanian from Celtic and approach it to Italic. Prósper further argues that Lusitanian predates the arrival of Celtic in the Iberian Peninsula and points out that it retains elements of Old European, making its origins possibly even older and situating it in the Bronze Age. This provides some support to the proposals of Mallory and Koch et al., who have postulated that the ancient Lusitanians originated from either Proto-Italic or Proto-Celtic speaking populations who spread from Central Europe into Western Europe after new Yamnaya migrations into the Danube valley, while Proto-Germanic and Proto-Balto-Slavic may have developed east of the Carpathian Mountains, in present-day Ukraine, moving north and spreading with the Corded Ware culture in Middle Europe (third millennium BCE). Alternatively, a European branch of Indo-European dialects, termed "North-west Indo-European" and associated with the Beaker culture, may have been ancestral to not only Italic and Celtic but also Germanic and Balto-Slavic.

Luján (2019) follows a similar line of thought but places the origin of Lusitanian even earlier; he argues that the evidence shows that Lusitanian must have diverged from the other western Indo-European dialects before the kernel of what would then evolve into the Italic and Celtic language families had formed. This points to Lusitanian being so ancient that it predates both the Celtic and Italic linguistic groups. Contact with subsequent Celtic migrations into the Iberian Peninsula are likely to have led to the linguistic assimilation of the Celtic elements found in the language.

Witczak and Mallory propose that Proto-Lusitanian tribes arrived before all the Celtic invasions, and represent the so-called Bell Beaker culture dating back to around 2600 BC. Archeological findings of this culture are recurrent in Western Europe, spanning from present day Ireland to Hungary, Denmark all the way to Sicily. This view positions Proto-Lusitanian tribes originating from the Netherlands and Rhineland region with shared lexical and phonological similarities between the onomastics found in the Gallia Belgica (which was inhabited by the Belgians, an Indo-European nation located zwischen Germanen und Kelten, i.e. between Germanic and Celtic tribes, see Ancient Belgian language) and that of the Lusitanians.

== Geographical distribution ==
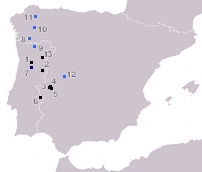
Lusitanian inscriptions are marked in black. The northern inscriptions 10 and 11 are dedications to Lugus and are probably Celtic

Inscriptions have been found in Cabeço das Fráguas (in Guarda), in Moledo (Viseu), in Arroyo de la Luz (in Cáceres) and most recently in Ribeira da Venda. Taking into account Lusitanian theonyms, anthroponyms and toponyms, the Lusitanian sphere would include modern northern Portugal and adjacent areas in southern Galicia, with the centre in Serra da Estrela.

The most famous inscriptions are those from Cabeço das Fráguas and Lamas de Moledo in Portugal and Arroyo de la Luz in Spain. Ribeira da Venda is the most recently discovered (2008).

A bilingual Lusitanian–Latin votive inscription is reported to attest the ancient name of Portuguese city of Viseu: Vissaîegobor.

== Writing system ==
All the known inscriptions are written in the Latin alphabet, which was borrowed by bilingual Lusitanians to write Lusitanian since Lusitanian had no writing system of its own. It is difficult to determine if the letters have a different pronunciation than the Latin values but the frequent alternations of c with g (porcom vs. porgom) and t with d (ifadem vs. ifate), and the frequent loss of g between vowels, points to a lenis pronunciation compared to Latin. In particular, between vowels and after r, b may have represented the sound /β/, and correspondingly g was written for /ɣ/, and d for /ð/.

== Grammar ==
Due to limited attestation, only rudimentary hints of Lusitanian grammar can be deduced. The following is based on Luján (2019) and Prósper (2021).

=== Syntax ===
Adjectives come after the nouns they modify.

Noun phrases may be joined by the copulative conjunction indi "and", for instance in oilam Trebopala indi porcom Laebo "a sheep for Trebopala and a pig for L." and in Ampilva indi Loemina "Ampilva and Loemina".

The unmarked word order in Lusitanian is subject–verb–object (SVO); however, subject–object–verb (SOV) is also attested.

=== Morphology ===
==== Nouns ====
Nouns in Lusitanian decline for at least three cases (nominative, accusative, dative), at least two genders (masculine and feminine) and two numbers (singular and plural). The genitive case and neuter gender are not attested in the surviving corpus.

Only two declension types are securely attested; they are the first declension (ā-stems) and second declension (o-stems). The third declension (consonant- and i-stems) has also been postulated. Their attested endings are:

Lusitanian nominal declension endings
		ā-stems	o-stems
Singular	Nominative	*-a	?
Singular	Accusative	-am	-om
Singular	Dative	-ae, -ai, -a	-oi
Plural	Nominative	?	-i
Plural	Accusative	-as	?
Plural	Dative	-abo	-obo

==== Verbs ====
Lusitanian preserves the thematic third-person singular present-tense ending -eti (in rueti "(it) runs") and the athematic third-person plural ending -enti (in doenti "they give").

The second and third person person future imperative ending -tōd appears in singeieto, which Prósper compares to Latin sanciō, future imperative sancītō.

== Inscriptions ==
Lamas de Moledo:

RUFUS ET
TIRO SCRIP
SERUNT
VEAMINICORI
DOENTI
ANGOM
LAMATICOM
CROUCEAI
MAGA
REAICOI PETRANIOI R[?]
ADOM PORGOMIOUEA [or ...IOUEAI]
CAELOBRIGOI

Cabeço das Fráguas:

OILAM TREBOPALA
INDO PORCOM LAEBO
COMAIAM ICONA LOIM
INNA OILAM USSEAM
TREBARUNE INDI TAUROM
IFADEM REUE...

Translation:

A sheep [lamb?] for Trebopala
and a pig for Laebo,
[a sheep] of the same age for Iccona Loiminna,
a one year old sheep for
Trebaruna and a fertile bull...
for Reve...

Arroyo de la Luz (I & II):

AMBATVS
SCRIPSI
CARLAE PRAISOM
SECIAS ERBA MVITIE
AS ARIMO PRAESO
NDO SINGEIETO
INI AVA INDI VEA
VN INDI VEDAGA
ROM TEVCAECOM
INDI NVRIM INDI
VDEVEC RVRSENCO
AMPILVA
INDI
LOEMINA INDI ENV
PETANIM INDI AR
IMOM SINTAMO
M INDI TEVCOM
SINTAMO

Arroyo de la Luz (III):

ISACCID·RVETI·
PVPPID·CARLAE·EN
ETOM·INDI·NA.[
....]CE·IOM·
M·

Ribeira da Venda:

[- - - - - -] AM•OILAM•ERBAM [---]
HARASE•OILA•X•BROENEIAE•H[------]
[....]OILA•X•REVE AHARACVI•TAV[---]
IFATE•X•BANDI HARACVI AV[---]
MVNITIE CARIA CANTIBIDONE•[--
APINVS•VENDICVS•ERIACAINV[S]
OVGVI[-]ANI
ICCINVI•PANDITI•ATTEDIA•M•TR
PVMPI•CANTI•AILATIO

Main language areas in Iberia c. 300 BC

== See also ==
- Celtiberian language
- Gallaecian language
- Ligurian (ancient language)
