= Endovelicus =

Pre-Roman god of the underworld, prophecy and Earth

Endovelicus (Portuguese: Endouellicus, Endovélico; Spanish: Endovélico, Enobólico) is one of the pre-Roman Lusitanian and Celtiberian gods of the Iron Age. He was originally a chthonic god. He was the God/Lord of the Underworld and of health, prophecy and the earth, associated with vegetation and the afterlife. Later accepted by the Romans themselves, who assimilated it to Pluto or to Serapis and made him a relatively popular god.

Endovelicus had a temple in São Miguel da Mota in Alentejo, Portugal, and there are numerous inscriptions and ex-votos dedicated to him in the Ethnological Museum of Lisbon; possible toponyms include Andévalo in Spain. The cult of Endovelicus prevailed until the 5th century, just when Christianity was spreading in the region.

== Etymology ==
In the last two centuries of scholarship, several etymologies have been proposed to Endovelicus's name.

In the 19th century, António da Visitação Freire classified it as a mixed Celtic and Phoenician name, adapted to the Roman language. The End- radical would be from Celtic languages; Bel (or Vel-) would be Phoenician for 'Lord' and -Cus is a usual word termination in Latin. José Leite de Vasconcelos believed the word Endovellicus was an originally Celtic title Andevellicos, meaning 'very good'.

An alternate reading derives the word velicus from the Celtic vailos ("wolf"). Wolves were symbolic animals to the god.

Another, more recently proposed possibility suggests a loanword from proto-Basque, from the *bels root. In this case the original name would have been *Endo-belles, "most black", fitting his chthonic characteristics.

== Temples and cult ==
There were several places where researchers think his cult could be observed:

In the municipality of Alandroal, there is the Santuário da Rocha da Mina (Mina's Rock Sanctuary); some authors classify it as a temple of Endovelicus. It is the only known place of this kind in Southern Portugal. Near the temple, we can find the Lucefecit rivulet that has been associated with Lucifer since the Middle Ages. Lucifer was the name used by the Romans for the Morning star and the goddess Venus. Some authors connect the name of the rivulet with the meaning of the place as being the "Glimpse of Light". A kilometer away, there is a sacred fountain that is said to be more ancient than the temple; its waters are still considered medicinal.

The temple is rocky and hemmed in by a rocky formation that protects the site and the chiselled flooring is often related to Roman sacrificial altars. This sort of monument is not uncommon in the North of Portugal and on the Spanish Meseta.

Leite de Vasconcelos mentions that the site was used by the inhabitants of the Roman Empire from all walks of life. Several inscriptions suggest that the temple of Endovelicus was used as an oracle. One of the inscriptions states: EX IMPERATO AVERNO. Leite de Vasconcelos translated this as “segundo a determinação que emanou de baixo" (by the determination that emanated from below) suggesting that there is a similarity to the Temple of Apollo at Delphi. Steam would emanate from below, deep within the earth, and bestow clairvoyance. Vasconcelos also suggests that believers practiced the incubatio, sleeping at the site, hoping for dreams they could interpret later.

In Castro de Ulaca in Province of Ávila, a city of the Vettones, a sanctuary dedicated to Vaelicus has been discovered. The name could be related to Endovelicus.

The most notable sanctuary hypothetically dedicated to Endovelicus, is the Roman Sanctuary of Panóias in Vila Real, Trás-os-Montes, with a complex system of "sinks" bearing Roman inscriptions. Nearby, in Cabeço de São Miguel da Mota, another temple dedicated to Endovelicus was built and, on its ruins, the Alans built or readapted the previous temple, a sanctuary dedicated to Saint Michael (São Miguel in Portuguese). The Muslims transformed the temple into a mosque, and with the Reconquista the temple was once again made a Christian temple. In 1559 the temple was still somewhat well preserved when the Cardinal Henrique ordered 96 marble columns to be removed from the place to build the Colégio do Espírito Santo in Évora. From the building only the staging remained. But archaeological forays have turned up pottery and amphorae as well as votive altars dedicated to Endovelicus, and lead to the discovery of several architectural elements, among them the "sinks" made in the rocks. The sinks suggests the existence of rituals, animal sacrifices and, maybe, feasts of a ritual nature.

== See also ==
- Lusitanian mythology
- List of deities
