= Arentius and Arentia =

Pair of indigenous Lusitanian deities

Arentius (Portuguese: Arâncio) and Arentia (Portuguese: Arância) are considered to be a pair of indigenous deities that belong to the Lusitanian pantheon, and attested mainly in epigraphy.

== Epigraphy ==
Scholars report at least 13 epigraphies (14 inscriptions, as of 2022) attesting either Arentius or Arentia, mostly located in central-eastern Lusitania, and, according to scholar Juan Olivares Pedreño, "well represented" in Egitania.

Both deities are attested either in isolation, or, rarely, as a pair. Olivares Pedreño suggested that their attestation as a pair seems to hark back to similar votive altars of a male and female divine couple in Celtic areas.

The pair is also alternatively attested as Arantius and Arantia, although this occurrence is rare.

In two inscriptions from Beira Baixa, Arentius is attested as Arantio Tanginiciaeco and as Arentio Cronisensi.

== Etymology ==
Francisco Marco Simón suggested that the pair were aquatic deities, following Hans Krahe's study on Old European hydronymy that associates the stem *ar- with the names of bodies of water.

Spanish historian José María Blázquez Martínez seems to support this interpretation. Also, according to Blazquez, Blanca María Prósper believes that Arantio (another attested name for Arentius) refers to a river deity.

== See also ==
- Castro culture
- Celtic mythology
- Lusitanian language
- National Archaeology Museum (Portugal)
- Pre-Roman peoples of the Iberian Peninsula
- Proto-Indo-European mythology
- Roman mythology

== Bibliography ==
- Beltrán Ortega, Alejandro (2021). "Epítetos Divinos De La Lusitania". Antigüedad: Religiones y Sociedades (in Spanish). 19 (19): 239–69. doi:10.20318/arys.2021.6053. S2CID 245464333..
- Marco Simón, Francisco (1999). "Divinidades indígenas en la Hispania indoeuropea". Veleia (in Spanish). 16: 33–49. hdl:10810/35975.
- Martínez, José (2006). "Nuevos teónimos indígenas hispanos. Addenda y corrigenda. II. La religiosidad de la Prehistoria hispana según F. Jordá". Zephyrus: Revista de prehistoria y arqueología (in Spanish). 59: 293–303. ISSN 0514-7336..
- Olivares Pedreño, Juan Carlos (1999). "Aportaciones al estudio de Arentius, Arentia y las divinidades indígenas masculinas de la religión de Egitania". Ilu. Revista de ciencias de las religiones (in Spanish). 4: 139–172. ISSN 1135-4712..
- Olivares Pedreño, José Carlos (2000–2001). "Teónimos y fronteras étnicas: los Lusitani". Lucentum (in Spanish). 19–20 (19–20): 245–256. doi:10.14198/LVCENTVM2000-2001.19-20.16 (inactive 11 July 2025). hdl:10045/1208. ISSN 0213-2338..
- Olivares Pedreño, Juan Carlos; Ramajo Correa, Luis María (2013). "Un altar votivo procedente de Cilleros dedicado a los dioses lusitanos "Arentia" y "Arentius" y precisiones sobre otra inscripción votiva de Villamiel (Cáceres)". Veleia (in Spanish). 30: 193–203. doi:10.1387/veleia.11224 (inactive 11 July 2025). hdl:10810/37246..
- Olivares Pedreño, Juan Carlos (2022). "Una paradoja de la teonimia y la antroponimia lusitano-galaica: ¿Migraciones hacia el sur del Sistema Central y el valle del Tajo?". Complutum (in Spanish). 33 (1): 231–47. doi:10.5209/cmpl.80893. hdl:10045/123692. S2CID 248955728..
- Redentor, Armando (2008). “Panorama da Teonímia Pré-romana em Trás-os-montes Oriental”. In: Divindades indígenas em análise. Coord. José d’ Encarnação. Coimbra e Porto: Centro de Estudos Arqueológicos, Universidade de Coimbra, Universidade do Porto, pp. 105-124.
- Salvado, Pedro; Guerra, Amílcar; Mendes Rosa, João (2004). "Um monumento votivo a Arância e Arâncio, proveniente de Castelejo (concelho do Fundão)". Revista portuguesa de Arqueologia (in Portuguese). 7 (2): 237–242..
