= Beira Baixa =

Beira Baixa may refer to the following places in Portugal:

- Beira Baixa Province, a former administrative division
- Beira Baixa (intermunicipal community), an administrative division
