= Zoelae =

Ancient Celtic tribe

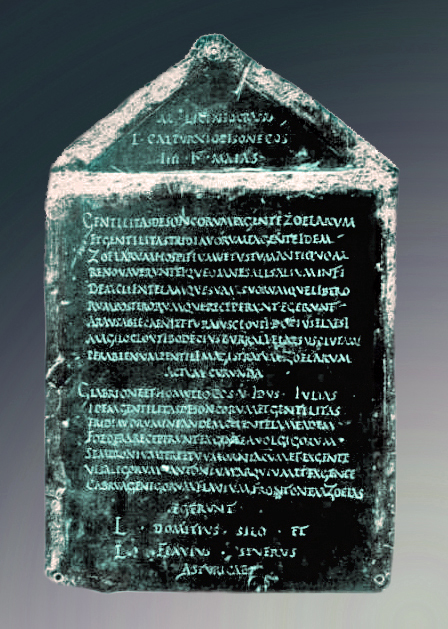
Table of the Zoelae or Table of Astorga is a legal text made on a bronze plate (32 cm × 24 cm (12.6 in × 9.4 in)) in a quadrangular shape and crowned by a triangular pediment inside which the consular data appears. It is located in the Staatliche Museen in Berlin.

The Zoelae were an ancient Celtic tribe of Gallaecia, living in the north of modern Portugal, in the province of Trás-os-Montes, between the mountains of Serra da Nogueira and the mountains of Mogadouro.

== See also ==
- Pre-Roman peoples of the Iberian Peninsula
