= Lusitanian mythology =

Lusitanian mythology is the mythology of the Lusitanians, the Indo-European-speaking people that inhabited the westernmost portion of the Iberian Peninsula, in what became known as Lusitania following its conquest by Rome. In present times, the territory comprises the central part of Portugal and small parts of Extremadura in northwest Spain.

Lusitanian deities heavily influenced all of the religious practices in western Iberia, including Gallaecia, with their beliefs and practices becoming intermingled with those of the Roman gods as part of the romanization of the peninsula. Recently, a Vasconian substrate is starting to be recognized.

== Deities ==
Through the Gallaecian-Roman inscriptions, a great pantheon of Gallaecian deities begins to emerge, sharing cults with other Celtic or Celticized peoples on the peninsula, such as the Astures—especially the more Western—and Lusitanians, but also the Gauls and Britons among others. However, because the borders shifted numerous times and Lusitanians and Gallaecians were often referred to as one people, it is relevant to note that some of the so-called Gallaecian or Lusitanian deities had the same theonyms.

=== Main pantheon ===
A number of deities were of particular importance and popularity, especially following the Roman conquest, most notably: Reve, Endovellico, Ataegina and Nabia.

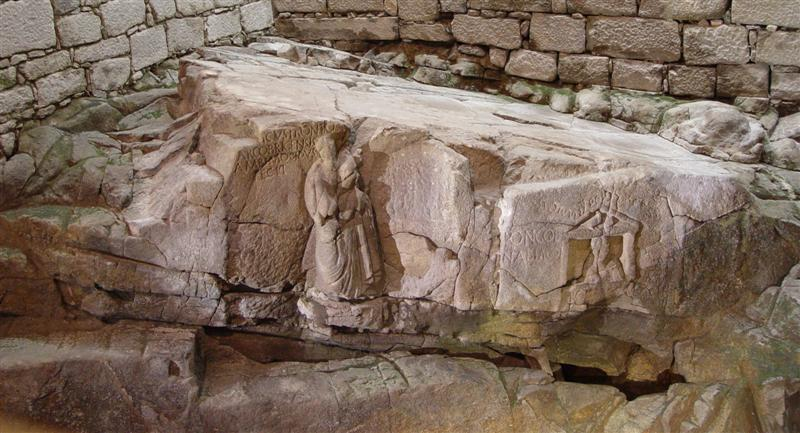
The Fonte do Ídolo (Portuguese for 'Fountain of the Idol'), in Braga.

- Reve (Reue): sky god associated with lightning, thunder and mountains, with authority to sit in judgement of the other gods, and seen as the protector of man. He is the most widely-referenced member of the pantheon (23 known epigraphs, as of 2025), associated with the sacrifice of bulls as a form of worship. Krzysztof Witczak, a professor of classical philology at the University of Łódź, suggests this may be the equivalent of the Roman Jupiter (Iovis), as both ultimate derive from the Proto-Indo-European *diewo-.
- Endovellico (Belenus): god of prophecy and healing, with oracular functions; he appears to have played a minor chthonic (underworld) role originally, then gained a much-elevated status following the Roman colonization.
- Ataegina: agrarian (and loosely chthonic) goddess oft-connected with Endovellico and roughly corresponding to Proserpina. Up to 29 surviving votive inscriptions to her may survive, almost all tightly clustered in the eastern part of the region which is now part of modern-day Spain (though many lack consensus among academics), where she is suspected to have been second only to Reve in importance.
- Nabia: may have been two separate deities, one invoked in tandem with Jupiter, possibly as the consort of the local Lusitanian equivalent; and another identified with Diana, Juno or Victoria (and Roman deities), linked to the protection and defense of the community or health, wealth and fertility. She was also associated with earth and sacred springs, possibly as the deity of water, fountains and rivers. Her name still endures in the region through the Navia River and the Fountain of the Idol in northern Portugal.
- Bandua (Bandi): their name appears in numerous dedications, mostly to a male deity (exceptionally, female in one), and often linked to a town or a location (e.g., Bandua Roudaeco, Etobrico or Brealiacui). The deity was probably the protector of the local community, often associated with the Roman Mars—possibly as the Gallaecian god of war—and in one dedication is considered a god or goddess of the Vexillum or standard. Appears to have enjoyed great success among the Gallaeci of Braga.

Walkthrough of the "Religions of Lusitania" exhibit at the National Archaeology Museum in Lisbon.

- Cosso: warrior god who attained great popularity among the Southern Gallaeci, and was one of the most revered throughout ancient Gallaecia. Several authors suggest that Cosso and Bandua are in fact the same god, but under different names.
- Berobreo: god of the Otherworld and beyond. The largest shrine dedicated to Berobreo documented until now, stood in the fort of the Torch of Donón (Cangas), in the Morrazo's Peninsula, front of the Cíes Islands.
- Bormanicus: god of hot springs, similar to the Gaulish god, Bormanus.
- Lugus (Lucubo): god of prosperity, trade and craft occupations; his figure is associated with the spear and is one of the most common among the Celts. Many place names are derived from it throughout Celtic Europe, from Galicia (Galicia Lucus Latinized form) to Loudoun (Scotland), and even the naming of people as Gallaecia Louguei.
- Coventina, goddess of abundance and fertility. Strongly associated with the water nymphs, their cult record for most Western Europe, from England to Gallaecia.
- Epona was a protector of horses, donkeys, and mules. She was particularly a goddess of fertility, as shown by her attributes of a patera, cornucopia, ears of grain and the presence of foals in some sculptures. She and her horses might also have been leaders of the soul in the after-life ride, with parallels in Rhiannon of the Mabinogion. Unusual for a Celtic deity, most of whom were associated with specific localities, the worship of Epona, "the sole Celtic divinity ultimately worshipped in Rome itself," was widespread in the Roman Empire between the first and third centuries CE.
- Trebaruna appears in inscriptions in the Lusitanian language associated with another, presumably male deity named Reve.

There is hardly any sign of Bandua, Reve, Arentius-Arentia, Quangeius, Munidis, Trebaruna, Laneana and Nabia—all worshipped in the heart of Lusitania—outside the boundary with the Vettones. Bandua, Reve and Nabia were worshiped in the core area of Lusitania (including Northern Extremadura to Beira Baixa and Northern Lusitania) and reaching inland Galicia, the diffusion of these gods throughout the whole of the northern interior area shows a cultural continuity with Central Lusitania.

=== Other deities ===
Two regional deities in Western Iberia do not occur in the region: Crouga, worshiped around Viseu, and Aernus, in the Bragança area. The largest number of indigenous deities found in the whole Iberian Peninsula are located in the Lusitanian-Galician regions, and models proposing a fragmented and disorganized pantheon have been discarded, since the number of deities occurring together is similar to those of other Celtic peoples in Europe and ancient civilizations.

Toga, female deity of the known Lusitanian mythology. Her name is in inscriptions found on Vettone and Lusitanian territory but the cult is thought to have Vettone origins.

A sun goddess, Kontebria (Cantabria), was apparently present, her worship later being assimilated into Virgin Mary's Nossa Senhora de Antime figure.

Dii, Lares, Nymphs and Genii were the main types of divinity worshiped, known from the Latin epigraphy, although many names are recorded in the Lusitanian or Celtiberian languages.

== See also ==
- Castro culture
- Enchanted moura
- Etruscan religion
- Germanic mythology
- Mare (folklore)
- Greek mythology
- List of the Pre-Roman peoples of the Iberian Peninsula
- Lists of deities
- Lusitanian language
- National Museum of Archaeology (Portugal)
- Ophiussa
- Proto-Indo-European mythology
- Roman mythology

== Works cited ==
- Coutinhas, José Manuel (2006). Aproximação à identidade etno-cultural dos Callaeci Bracari [Understanding the ethno-cultural identity of the Callaeci Bracari] (in European Portuguese). Porto.
- Fernández-Albalat, Blanca García (1990). Guerra y Religión en la Gallaecia y la Lusitania Antiguas [War and Religion in Ancient Gallaecia and Lusitania] (in European Spanish). A Coruña, Spain: Ediciós do Castro. ISBN 978-84-7492-475-6.
- García Martínez, Sonia María (1995). "La epigrafia romana del concelho de Guimarães: Un estado de la cuestión" [Roman epigraphy in the municipality of Guimarães: A review of the current situation] (PDF). Revista de Guimarães (in European Spanish). 105. Guimarães, Portugal: Martins Sarmento Society: 139–171. ISSN 0871-0759. Archived (PDF) from the original on Jan 19, 2026.
- Olivares Pedreño, Juan Carlos (January 1999). "Teonimos indigenas masculinos del ambito Lusitano-Galaico: un intento de sintesis" [Indigenous masculine theonyms of the Lusitanian-Galician region: an attempt at synthesis] (PDF). Revista de Guimarães (in European Spanish). 109 (a, Actas do Congresso de Proto-História Europeia). Guimarães, Portugal: Martins Sarmento Society: 277–296. ISSN 0871-0759. Archived (PDF) from the original on Jan 19, 2026.
- Olivares Pedreño, Juan Carlos (2002). Los Dioses de la Hispania Céltica [The Gods of Celtic Hispania] (in European Spanish). Madrid: Royal Academy of History. ISBN 978-84-95983-00-8.
- Robalo, Mário (June 27, 2002). "Deuses de pedra" [Gods of Stone]. Archaeological Museum of São Miguel de Odrinhas (in European Portuguese). Archived from the original on Feb 14, 2016.
