= Blanca María Prósper =

Spanish linguist and scholar of Celtic studies

Blanca María Prósper Pérez is a Spanish linguist and scholar of Celtic studies. Since 2019, she has been Professor (Catedrática) in Indo-European linguistics at the University of Salamanca.

== Biography ==
Blanca María Prósper earned a PhD in Indo-European linguistics from the Complutense University of Madrid in 1992.

== Works ==
- The Indo-European Names of Central Hispania: A Study in Continental Celtic and Latin Word Formation. Institut für Sprachen und Literaturen der Universität Innsbruck. 2016. ISBN 978-3-85124-739-8.
- El bronce celtibérico de Botorrita. Fabrizio Serra Editore. 2008. ISBN 978-8862271158.
- Estudio lingüístico del plomo celtibérico de Iniesta. Universidad de Salamanca. 2007. ISBN 978-84-7800-365-5.
- Lenguas y religiones prerromanas del occidente de la Península Ibérica. Universidad de Salamanca. 2002. ISBN 978-84-7800-818-6.
- La reconstrucción del adverbio indoeuropeo (Thesis). Editorial de la Universidad Complutense. 1992.

== See also ==
- Patrizia de Bernardo Stempel
- Javier de Hoz
