= Ataegina =

Iberian Goddess possibly related to the Underworld

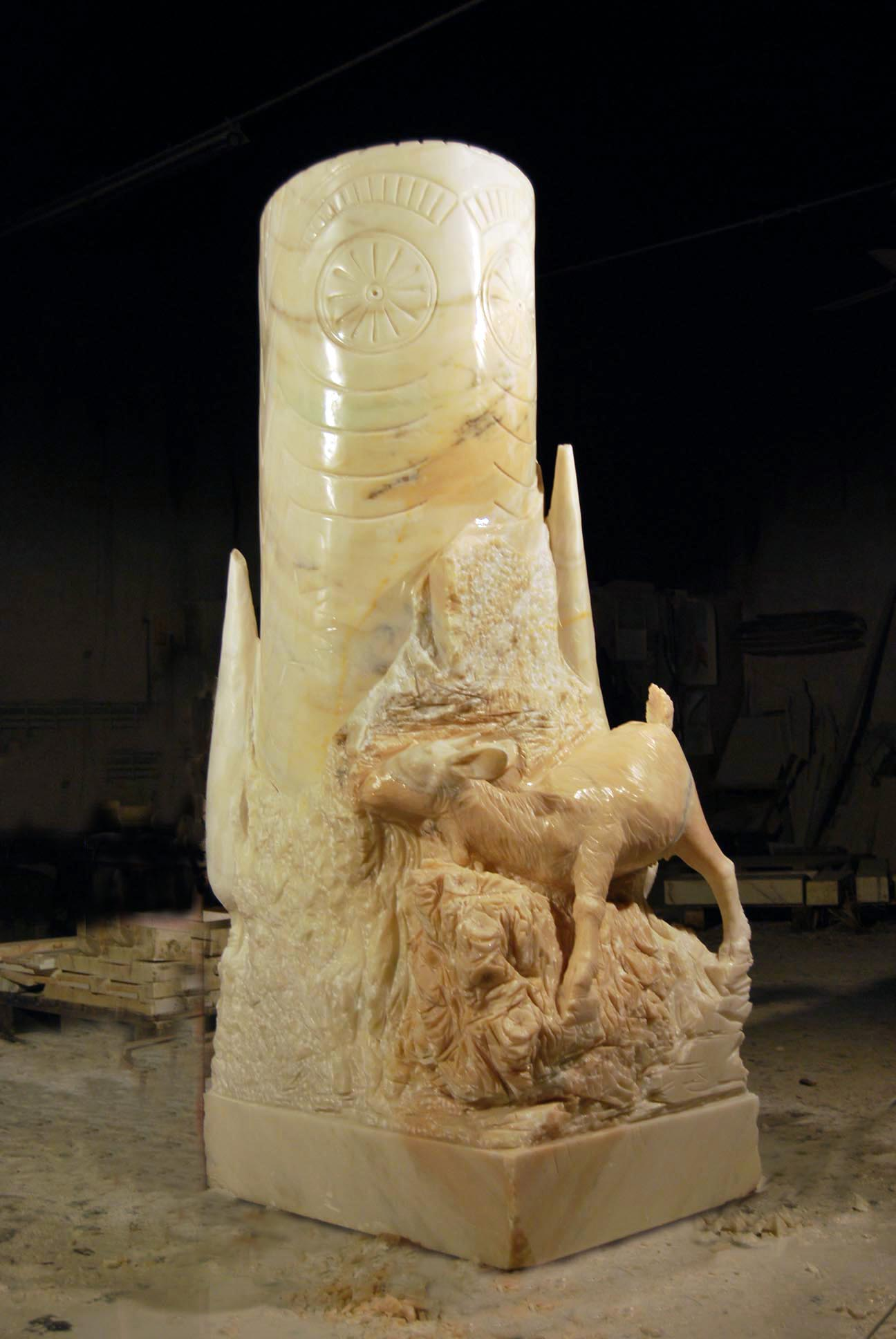
Ataegina. Marble, 210x93x72 cm, by the artist Pedro Roque Hidalgo, 2008. Museum of Marble, Vila Viçosa, Portugal

Ataegina (Spanish: Ataecina; Portuguese: Atégina) was a goddess worshipped by the ancient Iberians, Lusitanians, and Celtiberians of the Iberian Peninsula. She is believed by some to have been a goddess of the underworld or the night, or of the spring season.

== Names ==
The deity's name is variously attested as Ataegina, Ataecina, Adaecina and Adaegina, among other spellings, totalling, as of 2025, approximately 27 attestations. Her name appears in conjunction to a place named Turibriga or Turobriga (see below).

== Etymology ==
=== Celtic hypothesis ===
The name Ataegina is most commonly derived from a Celtic source: according to Cristina Maria Grilo Lopes and Juan Olivares Pedreño, French scholar D'Arbois de Jubainville and Portuguese scholar José Leite de Vasconcelos interpreted her name as a compound from *ate- 'repetition, re-' *-genos '(to be) born'. Thus, her name would mean 'The Reborn One' ("renascida", in the original).

Others propose a connection to the domain of nocturnal or underworld deities: Gabriel Sopeña tentatively saw a connection with Irish adaig 'night', which may indicate a relation to the underworld. Similarly, in a 1998 article, Eugenio Luján, based on the epigraphic evidence available until then, supposed that Adaecina is the original spelling of her name, and related it to Irish adaig, (Note: Other Celtic cognates include Irish athach, later athaig, and Welsh adeg.) and both deriving from a Proto-Celtic *adakī. This form would account for both words, but Luján refrained from offering a definitive etymology. Wolfgang Meid raises the possibility that Old Irish adaig may be a borrowing of Welsh adeg "time, occasion, period, season", whose native Irish cognate is athach "interval, space (of time)", derived from Proto-Celtic *atikā, from Proto-Indo-European *h₂et-i-keh₂, from *h₂et- (“to go”), making a connection between these words and Ataegina unlikely.

Italian linguist Patrizia de Bernardo Stempel argues for a Celtic etymology, from *atakī ('night'), from an earlier *at-ak-ī ('interval'). Thus, de Bernardo proposes, her name means "the one of the night". In a later article, she describes Ataecina as "the goddess of the nighttime", and derives her name from *Atakī-nā 'the divine (night)time'.

=== Other hypotheses ===
That said, her presence in decidedly non-Indo-European Iberian regions suggest that she may have an older, indigenous origin, in which case her name's etymology is more likely Iberian, Aquitanian or Tartessian.

In his late 19th-century study, José Leite de Vasconcelos, while proposing a Celtic reading of her name, also supposed her origins as a Celticized indigenous deity. Spanish historian José María Blázquez Martínez supported the idea of Ataegina's indigenous character, while remarking that a Celtic interpretation of her name as 'reborn' is "inviable", and that her connection to Irish 'night' is "difficult".

== Centers of worship ==
Ataegina was worshipped in Lusitania and Betica; there were also sanctuaries dedicated to Ataegina in Elvas (Portugal), and Mérida and Cáceres in Spain, along with other places, especially near the Guadiana river. She was one of the goddesses worshipped in Myrtilis (today's Mértola, Portugal), Pax Julia (Beja, Portugal). A bronze plaque from Malpartida de Cáceres suggests associations with the goat as a sacred animal.

=== Turibriga or Turobriga ===
Her name appears with adjective Turobrigensis, which seems to indicate a place called Turibriga or Turobriga. Similar epigraphic attestations read Turibrige, [T]urubricae and Turibri, which led professor Amílcar Guerra to indicate a form *Turibris.

This place is interpreted by scholarship to mean the main center of her cult, but its precise location is unknown. Classical author Pliny indicated it belonged to Celtic Beturia.

== Functions ==
Epigraphs from the Badajoz region associate the goddess with the Roman Proserpina (analogous to Greek Persephone), which would make her a goddess presiding over spring and seasonality, echoing the "reborn" derivation of the name, or connect her to the Underworld. In that regard, a dedication etched in marble was found in Augusta Emérita: the propitiator prays to Dea Ataecina Turibrig(ensis) Proserpina for her to avenge the theft of some pieces of clothing.

== See also ==
- Ataecina (dwarf planet)

== Bibliography ==
- Frías, Manuel Salinas de; Cortés, Juana Rodríguez. "Corrientes religiosas y vías de comunicación en Lusitania durante el Imperio Romano". In: V Mesa Redonda Internacional sobre Lusitania Romana: las comunicaciones. Cáceres, Facultad de Filosofía y Letras, 7, 8 y 9 de noviembre de 2002. Madrid: Ministerio de Cultura, Secretaría General Técnica, Subdirección General de Información y Publicaciones, 2004. pp. 286–292.
- Guerra, Amílcar (2002). "Omnibus Numinibus et Lapitearum: algumas reflexões sobre a nomenclatura teonímica do Ocidente peninsular". Revista portuguesa de arqueologia. 5 (1): 147–159. ISSN 0874-2782..
- Lopes, Cristina Maria Grilo (2014). "Ataegina uma divindade Paleohispânica". Revista Santuários. 1 (1). Lisboa: 97–103. hdl:10451/12344..
- Martínez, Eugenio Ramón Luján (1998). "La diosa Ataecina y el nombre de la noche en antiguo irlandés". Emerita: Revista de lingüística y filología clásica. 66 (2): 291–306. doi:10.3989/emerita.1998.v66.i2.259. ISSN 0013-6662..
- Olivares Pedreño, Juan Carlos. Los dioses de la hispania céltica. Universitat d´Alacant / Universidad de Alicante, Servicio de Publicaciones: Real Academia de la Historia. 2002. pp. 247–249. ISBN 84-95983-00-1.
- Vasconcellos, José Leite de. Religiões da Lusitania na parte que principalmente se refere a Portugal. Lisboa: Imprensa nacional, 1897. pp. 146–173.
