= Reo (deity) =

Lusitanian god

Reo is a name appearing on Latin dedications to a Lusitanian-Gallaecian deity, usually with an epithet relating to a place, such as Reo Paramaeco discovered in Lugo in Galicia. The name Reo is in the Latin dative case, for a Latinized name *Reus.

== Epigraphy ==
Reve is considered to be a very diffused Palaeo-Hispanic deity in the Western part of the Iberian Peninsula, which would indicate it was "the most popular" of the pantheon. The name appears in at least 20 attestations (as of 2025, 23), with variations:

- Reue Reumiraego (Vilardevós, Orense);
- Reo Bormanico;
- Reo Paramaeco (Lugo);
- Reoue Vadumic(o);
- Reove;
- Reve Anabaraeco, Reuue Anabaraeco, Reuue Anabaraego (Rubiana and Las Burgas, Orense);
- Reve Larauco (Serra do Larouco, Ourense);
- Reve Veisuto (Mosteiro de Ribeira, Xinzo de Lima, Ourense);
- Reue Marandicui (Guiães, Vila-Real);
- Reve amoaego arcuneu (Ginza de Limia, Orense);
- Reve siboico (alternate readings: Tebieco or Siddico) (Celanova, Orense);
- Reve langanidae(i)gui (Castelo Branco);
- Reve langanid[aeco] (Castelo Branco);
- Reve langanitaeco (Idanha-a-Nova, Castelo Branco);
- Rebe Trasanci;
- Reve Aharacvi (Arronches).

=== Interpretations ===
Analysing the attestations, a nominative form *Reu-s or *Revs is proposed.

The name Rebe is indicated as the betacist form of Reve, interpreted by Villar and Prósper as a feminine form of the theonym.

==== Epithets ====
The epithet Bormanico probably derives from a river name *Bormano-, a word cognate to the name of continental Celtic deity Borvo.

Apart from Reo Larauco ('Reus of Larouco') the epithets share an -aik- element interpreted as an adjectival marker familiar from Lusitanian inscriptions in the dedications to Reo Paramaeco ('Reus of Paramo') Amoaego Arcunii, Anabaraeco, and Alabaraico Sulensi.

The first element Reo/Reus is very similar to the name Reue appearing on the Lusitanian Cabeço das Fráguas inscription, part of which reads INDI TAVROM IFADEM REVE T..., usually interpreted as "and (or thereafter) a fertile(?) bull for Reue" with the epithet lost. Reue therefore also seems to be a dative in the Lusitanian form of the name. Reue appears again on the Ribeira da Venda inscription, including an epithet, as REVE AHARACVI - this time the deity is receiving a sacrifice of ten sheep.

== Etymology ==
=== Reflex of the Proto-Indo-European Sky-God ===
Polish scholar K. T. Witczak derives the name from earlier *diewo, suggesting that the Lusitanian language changed the Proto-Indo European d to r, making Reo a sky deity similar to (and having a name cognate with) the Greek Zeus and Roman Jupiter, something which may be supported by dedications to him near mountains which also allude to Roman Jupiter.

=== Water deity ===
In another line of scholarship, other authorities such as Blázquez and Villar suggest he may have been a deity linked to rivers and that the name derives from a root meaning 'a flow' or 'current'.

== See also ==
- Bull (mythology)
