= Nabia =

Pre-Roman Iberian goddess

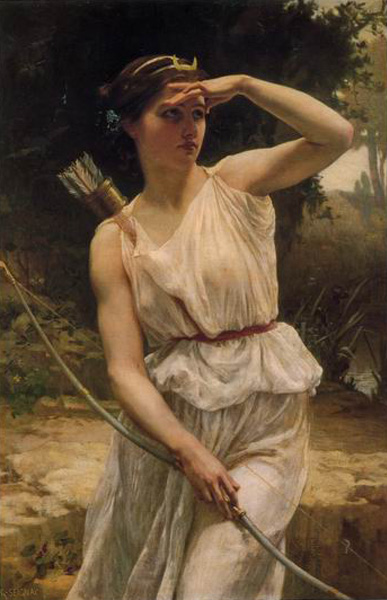
Diana, the Roman goddess often compared to Nabia.

Nabia (or Navia) was a goddess of the Pre-Roman peoples of the Iberian Peninsula, although she also had an extended cult during the Roman occupation of the peninsula.

Nabia was worshipped in many places on the Iberian Peninsula, sometimes in very different ways, leading some historians to suggest that "Nabia" was just a common word used by different peoples to refer to their deities (a theory questioned by others). Due to the uncertainty of her nature, she is sometimes interpreted as a water deity, other times she is associated with valleys, forests and hills, and she's further seen as the goddess of fertility, health, and abundance.

Her name, including variations, is attested in 28 inscriptions as of 2025.
