= Theonym =

Proper name of a deity

A theonym (from Greek theos (Θεός), 'god', attached to onoma (ὄνομα), 'name') is a proper name of a deity.

Theonymy, the study of divine proper names, is a branch of onomastics, the study of the etymology, history, and use of proper names. Theonymy helps develop an understanding of the function and societal views of particular gods and may help understand the origins of a society's language.

Analysis of theonyms has been useful in understanding the connections of Indo-European languages and possibly their religion. In all languages, the analysis of the possible etymological origin of a theonym can serve as basis for theories of its historical origin. Metaphysical and mystical meanings are also discerned in theonyms, as in Kabbalah. Theonyms can also appear as all or part of a name for a human, animal, plant, thing or place.

== See also ==
- -onym
- Theo
- Theology
- Thealogy, similar origin as above, but female instead
- God (word)
- Names of God
- Nomenclature
- Onomastics
- Theophoric name
