= Wu Gang =

Chinese mythical figure

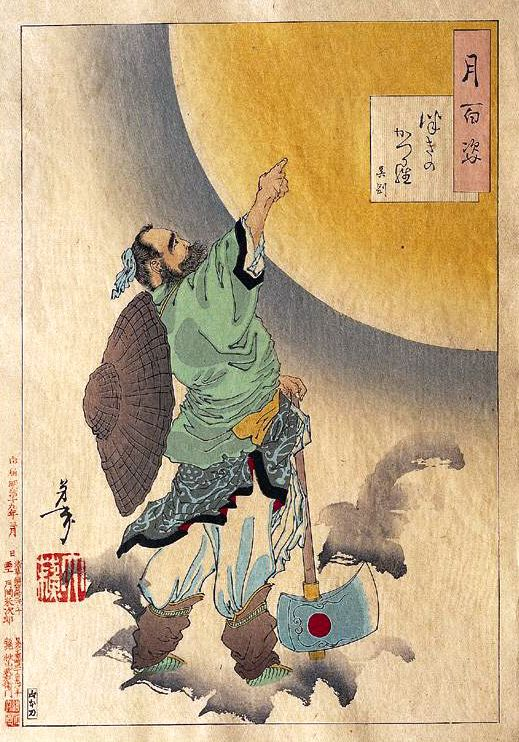
- An 1886 Japanese print of Wu Gang by Yoshitoshi.), published 1645
- Chinese: 吴刚
Transcriptions
Standard Mandarin
- Hanyu Pinyin: Wú Gāng

Wu Gang (simplified Chinese: 吴刚; traditional Chinese: 吳剛; pinyin: Wú Gāng), formerly romanized as Wu Kang and also known as Wu Zhi in some sources, is a figure in traditional Chinese folklore and religion. He is known for endlessly cutting down a self-healing osmanthus tree on the Moon, (Note: The tree is given in the Chinese sources as a guì (桂), which originally referred to both the sweet osmanthus (now 桂花, "guì flower"), a species of olive, and the cassia (now 肉桂, "meat guì"). Because of the latter's greater importance in modern international trade, it is often encountered in English translations although the sweet-smelling osmanthus is the one meant. See, for instance, Wolfram, who consistently translates guì (桂) as "cassia" while in fact describing and giving the scientific name for sweet osmanthus. In Chinese, meanwhile, the chengyu "pluck osmanthus in the Toad Palace" (蟾宫折桂, chángōng-zhéguì) associating the lunar tree with passing the imperial examinations eventually led to the association of the tree with the true laurel, which bears similar associations in European cultures from its use in Greece and Rome. It is now known in Chinese as the yuèguì (月桂) or "Moon guì" and connected with the earlier myths.) a divine punishment which has led to his description as the Chinese Sisyphus. In modern Chinese, the chengyu "Wu Gang chopping the tree" (吳剛伐桂; wúgāng-fáguì) is used to describe any endless toil. The specific reason for his situation has varied in the sources, but Wu Gang's story dates back to at least the Tang dynasty.

== Legend ==
=== Origins ===
An origin myth for the lunar phases was that a great forest or great tree grew there, swiftly growing and losing leaves and blossoms over the course of each month. After the expansion of the Chinese cultural area south of the Yangtze during the Qin and Han dynasties, the lunar trees became associated with the fragrant and white-blossoming Osmanthus fragrans. This tree flowers during the autumn and promoted the connection of the harvest festival with the Moon, a connection still observed during the modern Mid-Autumn Festival. Confections and cassia wine flavored with its blossoms are also still associated with the holiday.

By the time of the Han, the Huainanzi associated the waxing of the moon with trees growing from the feet of a Daoist immortal.

In his Compendium of Materia Medica, Li Shizhen explains that Wu Gang was added to the stories about the holiday from novellas published during the Sui and Tang dynasties.

=== First version ===
The 9th-century Miscellaneous Morsels from Youyang mentions a lunar tree over five hundred zhang high. A certain Wu Gang of Xihe stands under it, constantly chopping at the tree, which grows back after it is chopped.

=== Second version ===
Wu witnessed a liaison between his wife and Yandi's grandson, after the two had already carried on an affair so long it begat three sons. In a rage, Wu murdered his wife's lover but Yandi ordered Wu banished to the Moon, where he would cut down a tree. After each blow, the tree healed itself and Wu was therefore forced to cut at it forever.

=== Third version ===
Another version features a cherry bay. In this version, Wu Gang began the attempt to become a Taoist immortal but gave up lazily midway through the process. The Jade Emperor was furious and decided to punish him. The Emperor created a cherry bay on the Moon and Wu Gang was invited to chop it down in order to become an immortal. Wu Gang tried, but again the tree healed itself and the task was impossible. The shadows on the Moon are said to be created by the growing cherry bay.

=== Fourth version ===
In yet another version, Wu found a teacher in the mountains in his quest for immortality. When his teacher taught him to heal, he gave up after three days. When he was taught to play Chinese chess, he gave up after two days. When he was taught the method of eternal life, he gave up after a day. His teacher then sent him to the Moon to chop down the tree.

== See also ==
- Man in the Moon – similar folklores around the world
- Sisyphus – a similar figure from Greek mythology
- Chang'e
- Moon rabbit
