= Man in the Moon =

Pattern observed on the Moon's surface

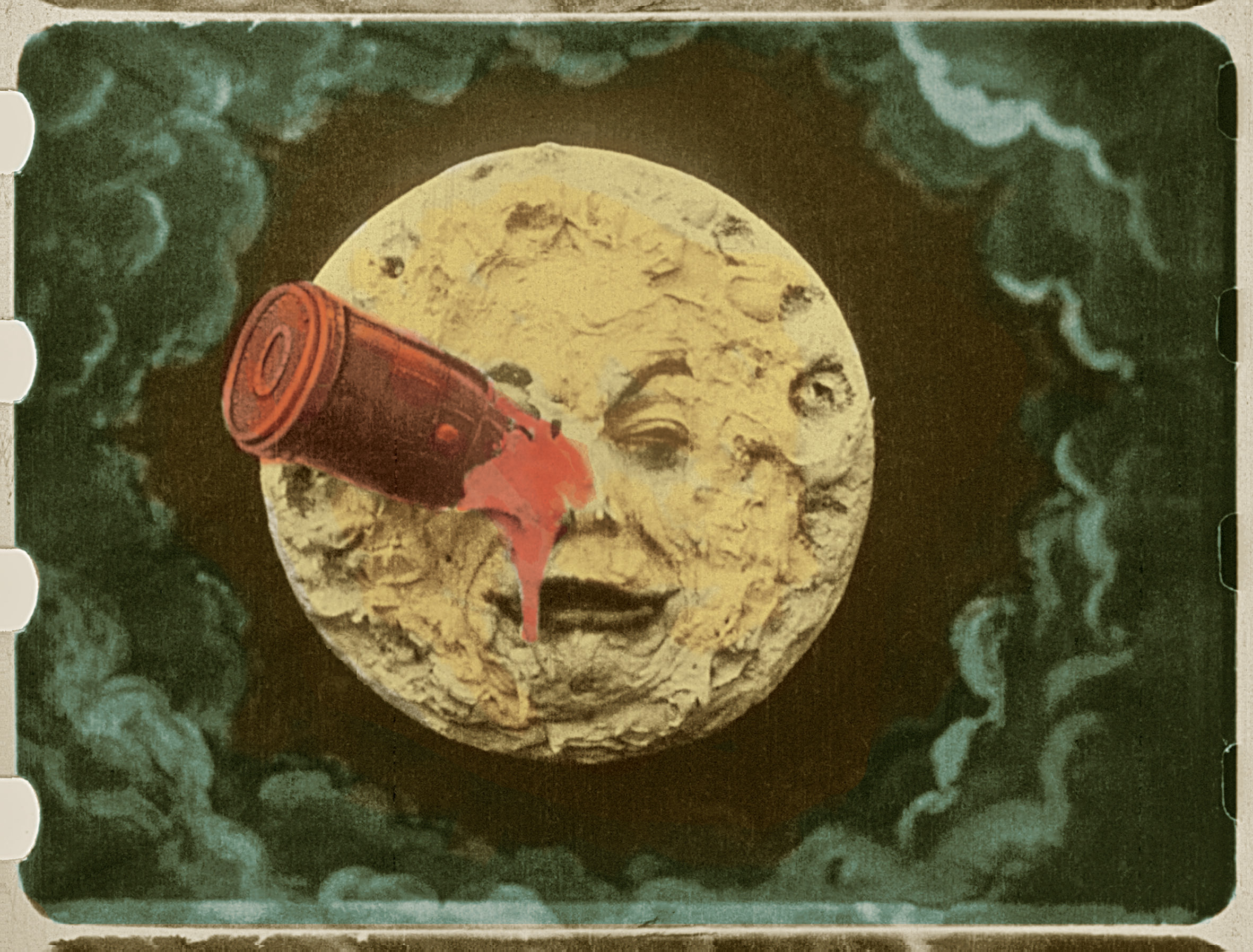
The Man in the Moon is struck by a spacecraft in the Georges Méliès 1902 fantasy film Le Voyage dans la Lune.

In many cultures, several images of a human face, head or body are recognized in the disc of the full moon; they are generally known as the Man in the Moon. The images are based on the appearance of the dark areas (known as lunar maria) and the lighter-colored highlands (and some lowlands) of the lunar surface.

== Origin ==
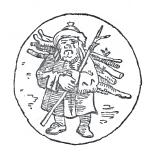
Germanic woodcutter

There are various explanations for how the Man in the Moon came to be.

A longstanding European tradition holds that the man was banished to the Moon for some crime. Jewish lore says that the image of Jacob is engraved on the Moon. Another held that he is the man caught gathering sticks on the Sabbath and sentenced by God to death by stoning in the Book of Numbers XV.32–36. Some Germanic cultures thought he was a woodcutter found working on the Sabbath. There is a Roman legend that he is a sheep-thief.

One medieval Christian tradition claims that he is Cain, the Wanderer, forever doomed to circle the Earth. Dante's Inferno alludes to this:

For now doth Cain with fork of thorns confine
On either hemisphere, touching the wave
Beneath the towers of Seville. Yesternight
The moon was round.

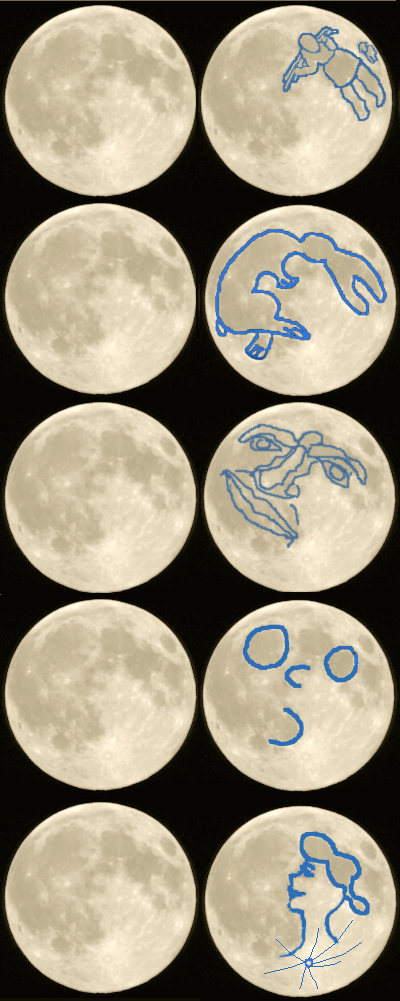
Different patterns identified in the appearance of the Near side of the Moon, among them the Man in the Moon and the Moon rabbit

This is mentioned again in his Paradise:

But tell, I pray thee, whence the gloomy spots
Upon this body, which below on earth
Give rise to talk of Cain in fabling quaint?

John Lyly says in the prologue to his Endymion (1591), "There liveth none under the sunne, that knows what to make of the man in the moone."

In Norse mythology, Máni is the male personification of the Moon who crosses the sky in a horse-drawn carriage. He is continually pursued by the Great Wolf Hati who catches him at Ragnarök. Máni simply means "Moon".

In Chinese mythology, the goddess Chang'e is stranded upon the Moon after consuming a double dose of an immortality potion. In some versions of the myth, she is accompanied by Yu Tu, a Moon rabbit. Another mythology tells the story of Wu Gang, a man on the Moon who is trying to cut down a tree that always regrows.

In Haida mythology, the figure represents a boy gathering sticks. The boy's father had told him the Moon's light would brighten the night, allowing the chore to be completed. Not wanting to gather sticks, the boy complained and ridiculed the Moon. As punishment for his disrespect, the boy was taken from Earth and trapped on the Moon.

In Japanese mythology, it is said that a tribe of human-like spiritual beings live on the Moon. This is especially explored in The Tale of the Bamboo Cutter. There is, however, also an interpretation of the markings being a rabbit (similar to Yu Tu in Chinese mythology) baking rice cakes, popular as an explanation for children.

In Vietnamese mythology, the Man in the Moon is named Cuội. He was originally a woodcutter on Earth who owned a magical banyan. One day, when his wife ignorantly watered the tree with unclean water and caused it to uproot itself to fly away, Cuội grabbed its roots and was taken to the Moon. There, he eternally accompanied the Moon Lady and the Jade Rabbit. The trio has become the personifications of the Tết Trung Thu, when they descend to the mortal world and give out cellophane lanterns, mooncakes and gifts to children.

In Latvian legends, two maidens went naked from the sauna with carrying poles to the well. While collecting water, one of the women noted how beautiful the Moon is. The other was unimpressed, saying her bottom was prettier and proceeded to moon the Moon. As a punishment, either Dievs or Mēness (Moon deity) put the woman along with a carrying pole on the Moon, with her bottom now visible to everyone.

In Brittany, a story tells of a gorse thief named Yann who was coming home on a full-moon carrying his prize. When a local farmer confronted him, Yann said: "This is mine, may the moon swallow me if I stole it!" And so it happened, and the shape of the thief with his load of gorse can still be seen on a full-moon.

== Traditions ==
There is a traditional European belief that the Man in the Moon enjoyed drinking, especially claret. An old ballad runs (original spelling):

Our man in the moon drinks clarret,
With powder-beef, turnep, and carret.
If he doth so, why should not you
Drink until the sky looks blew?

In the English Middle Ages and Renaissance, the Moon was held to be the god of drunkards, and at least three London taverns were named "The Man in the Moone". The man in the Moon is named in an early dated English nursery rhyme:

The man in the moon came tumbling down
And asked his way to Norwich;
He went by the south and burnt his mouth
With supping cold pease porridge.

== Examples and occurrence globally ==
One tradition sees a figure of a man carrying a wide burden on his back. He is sometimes seen as accompanied by a small dog. Various cultures recognise other examples of lunar pareidolia, such as the Moon rabbit.

In the Northern Hemisphere, a common Western perception of the face has it that the figure's eyes are Mare Imbrium and Mare Serenitatis, its nose is Sinus Aestuum, and its open mouth is Mare Nubium and Mare Cognitum. This particular human face can also be seen in tropical regions on both sides of the equator. However, the Moon orientation associated with the face is observed less frequently—and eventually not at all—as one moves toward the South Pole.

Conventionalized illustrations of the Man in the Moon seen in Western art often show a very simple face in the full moon, or a human profile in the crescent moon, corresponding to no actual markings. Some depict a man with a face turned away from the viewer on the ground, for example when viewed from North America, with Jesus Christ's crown shown as the lighter ring around Mare Imbrium. Another common one is a cowled Death's head looking down at Earth, with the black lava rock 'hood' around the white dust bone of the skull, and also forming the eye sockets.

"The Man in the Moon" can also refer to a mythological character said to live on or in the Moon, but who is not necessarily represented by the markings on the face of the Moon. An example is Yue-Laou, from Chinese tradition; another is Aiken Drum from Scotland.

The Man in the Moone by Francis Godwin, published in 1638, is one of the earliest novels thought of as containing several traits prototypical of science fiction.

== Scientific explanation ==
The Man in the Moon is made up of various lunar maria—which ones depend on the pareidolic image seen. These vast, flat spots on the Moon are called "maria" or "seas" because, for a long time, astronomers believed they were large bodies of water. They are large areas formed by lava that covered up old craters and then cooled, becoming smooth, basalt rock.

The near side of the Moon with these maria that make up the man is always facing Earth due to a tidal locking, or synchronous orbit. Thought to have occurred because of the gravitational forces partially caused by the Moon's oblong shape, its rotation has slowed to the point where it rotates exactly once on each trip around the Earth. This causes the same side of the Moon to always face toward Earth.

== Gallery ==
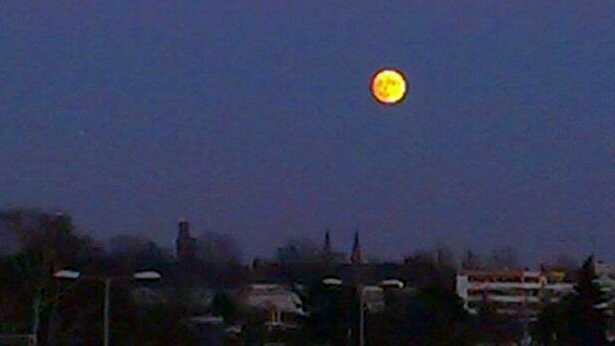
Near full moon over Berlin, Germany, in December 2015, approximately 30 minutes after moonrise

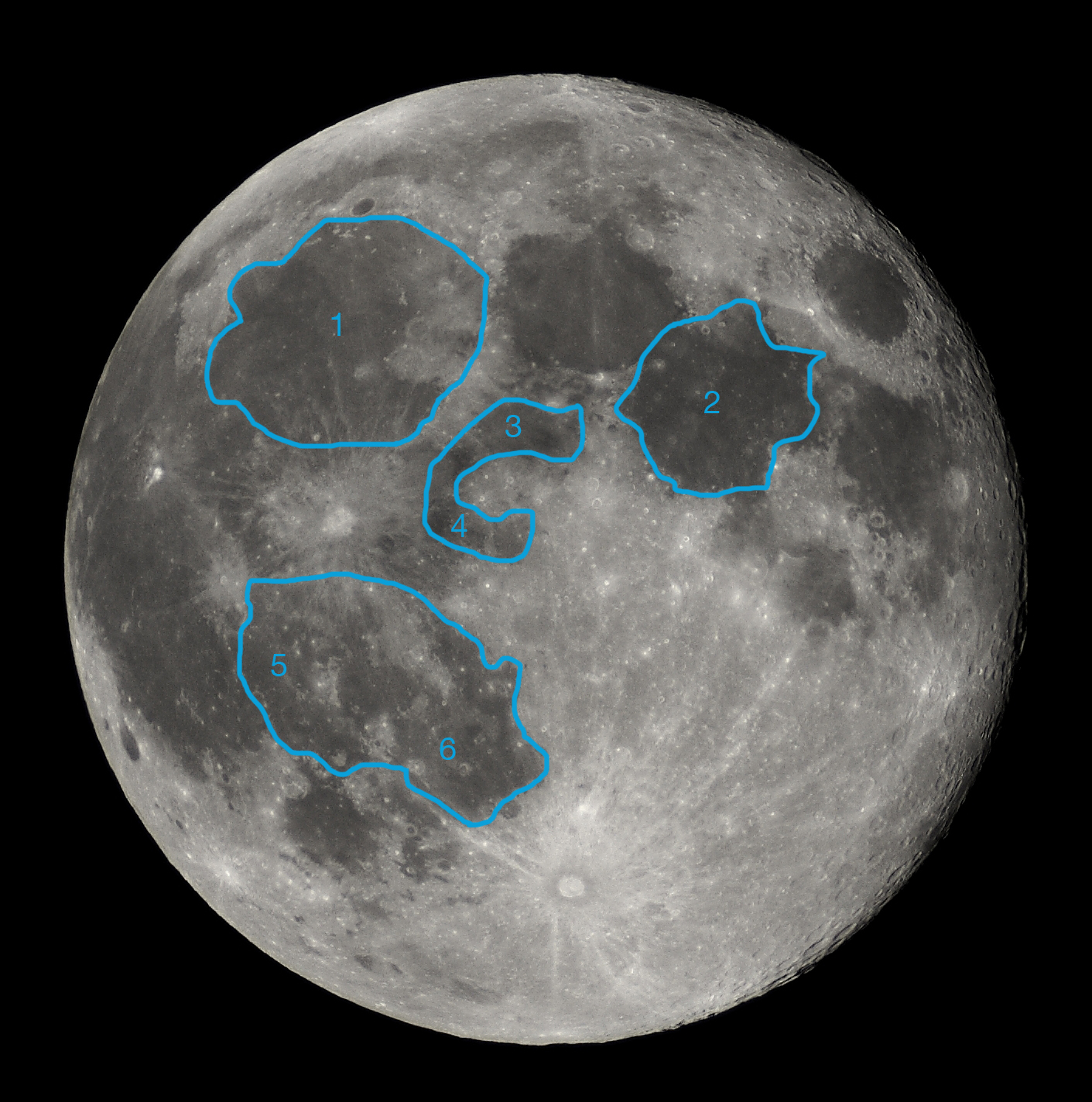
Common interpretation of the Man in the Moon as seen from the Northern Hemisphere

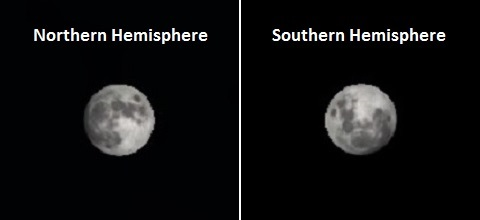
Moon's appearance for same longitude, but different hemispheres, 30 minutes after moonrise (generated model)

== See also ==
- The Moon is made of green cheese
- Moon rabbit
