= Daughter of the Moon Goddess =

2022 fantasy novel by Sue Lynn Tan

- First edition
- Author: Sue Lynn Tan
- Audio read by: Natalie Naudus
- Illustrator: Kuri Huang
- Language: English
- Genre: Fantasy, romantic fantasy
- Publisher: Harper Voyager
- Publication date: January 11, 2022 (US); January 20, 2022 (UK)
- Publication place: United States; United Kingdom
- Media type: Print (hardcover), ebook, audiobook
- Pages: 503 pp.
- ISBN: 9780063031302 (hardcover 1st ed.)
- OCLC: 1290892210
- Dewey Decimal: 823/.92
- LC Class: PR9450.9.T365 D38 2022

Daughter of the Moon Goddess is the first novel in the complete Celestial Kingdom Duology by Malaysian writer Sue Lynn Tan. It is Tan’s debut novel and was published on January 11, 2022, by Harper Voyager, a fantasy and science fiction imprint of HarperCollins. The plot is an adult fantasy reimagination of the popular Chinese legend of the moon goddess, Chang'e, and is inspired by the Mid-Autumn Festival. This high fantasy novel follows Xingyin, daughter of the moon goddess, as she sets off on a quest to free her mother from the Celestial Emperor’s spell, which imprisons her on the moon. Having to face some of the most powerful immortals in the realm, Xingyin’s story is an acclaimed national and international bestseller featuring romance, sacrifice, and adventure.

== Synopsis ==
The story follows Xingyin, who has spent her life hidden on the moon with her mother, Chang’e. Chang’e drank an immortality elixir originally meant for her husband, the archer Houyi; she ascended to the Celestial plane against the Emperor’s wishes, and was condemned to light the lanterns in the Moon Palace’s garden each night. When Xingyin’s magic unexpectedly flares once she comes of age, it alerts the Celestial Court to her secret presence on the moon. She is forced to flee in order to keep her identity a secret and is separated from her mother.

Xingyin arrives in the Celestial Kingdom anonymously and enters the palace service. She swears a private oath to free her mother from the Emperor’s punishment. Her mastery of archery draws the attention of Crown Prince Liwei and the pair become close friends as they study and train together. Xingyin eventually earns a place in the Celestial Army, where her missions take her across the immortal realms, to the Eastern Sea, the Winged Kingdom, and the Demon Realm. Throughout her time in the Celestial Court, her feelings towards Liwei create political discourse and disrupt her already fragile relationship with the Celestial Emperor and Empress. Simultaneously, Xingyin tries to navigate a flourishing friendship with Wenzhi, a commander whose loyalty grows increasingly dubious.

She is forced to fight mythological beasts and lift curses, while finding out what really brought about her parents’ downfall. Determined to free her mother, Xingyin embarks on a final mission to earn the Celestial Emperor’s favor, in hopes that he will grant her a single wish. She reveals Wenzhi’s hidden identity and the story culminates in a battle inside the Celestial Palace.

Xingyin ultimately succeeds in freeing her mother from the Emperor’s punishment, but at a great personal cost. Her relationships with Liwei and Wenzhi are changed forever, and Xingyin must face her uncertain place between the mortal and immortal worlds.

== Characters ==
- Xingyin – Daughter of Chang’e and Houyi. She is headstrong, determined, and skilled at the flute and qin. Her sense of honour earns her an esteemed position in the Celestial Army, where her accomplishments award her a single wish from the Emperor.
- Prince Liwei – The Crown Prince, son of the Celestial Emperor and Empress, becomes Xingyin’s first companion and love interest. He advocates for her to study alongside him in his private lessons with the royal teacher, Daoming, and quickly becomes Xingyin’s closest confidant within the Celestial Court.
- Captain Wenzhi – Captain of the Guard under whom Xingyin serves as an independent soldier. He is an emboldened fighter renowned throughout the realm for undertaking the deadliest and most life-threatening missions.
- Chang'e – The melancholic Moon Goddess imprisoned by the Celestial Emperor. She mourns her separation from her beloved, but mortal, husband, Houyi. She plays a pivotal role in Xingyin’s education, from literature to music, but never teaches her daughter magic.
- Celestial Emperor – Ruler of the Celestial Kingdom and the primary antagonist in Xingyin’s story. He is desperate to acquire more power, which has the possibility of altering the balance of the world.
- Celstial Empress – Originally from the Phoenix Kingdom, she arranges a marriage between Liwei and the daughter of Phoenix nobility.
- General Jianyun – General of the Celestial Army, with whom both Liwei and Xingyin train. Despite being a formidable warrior, he develops a soft spot for Xingyin and takes on a fatherly role in the story.
- Ping'er – An aunt-like figure to Xingyin, though formally her maid or governess, she helps Chang’e raise her, providing a structured education and nurturing Xingyin’s love for music.
- Suxiao – A loyal warrioress Xingyin befriends during her time in the Celestial Army. Her friendship becomes crucial in the story when the truth of Xingyin’s identity is inevitably revealed.

== Inspiration ==
Daughter of the Moon Goddess is Sue Lynn Tan’s reimagination of the popular Chinese tradition, the Mid-Autumn Festival. The festival celebrates the harvest and reunion of family on the fifteenth day of the eight lunar month, when the moon is supposedly at its fullest and brightest. Tan frequently mentions her personal connection to Asian mythology and memories of celebrating the Mid-Autumn Festival in interviews, highlighting how her childhood love for the legend of Chang’e influenced her retelling. Her interviews also spotlight how the multiplicity of the original myth, the general contradictions and regional variations, generated leeway in the kind of story she could conjure. For instance, the precise reason why Chang’e decides to take Houyi's elixir of immortality has several iterations, offering an opportunity for Tan to explore that blank space with greater freedom.

Sue Lynn Tan intertwines the significance of the festival through poignant imagery, especially through the pivotal narrative symbols of lanterns, throughout the story. Traditional East Asian paper lanterns have upheld significant cultural value in China, embodying fertility among other meanings. The varying shapes and images used to design them originally drew from nature, myths, or local mythology specific to individual regions of China. In Daughter of the Moon Goddess, the festival’s themes of longing, separation, and connection are mirrored in the relationship between Xingyin and her mother, especially since Xingyin’s journey throughout the Celestial Kingdom is driven by her hopeful reunion with her mother and her determination to break Chang’e’s punishment. Sue Lynn Tan also explicitly ties lanterns into the narrative by making them central to Chang’e’s punishment. Each night, Chang’e must light every lantern in the Moon Palace’s gardens so the mortal realm can see the illumination of the moon at night. If she fails to do so, it would be in direct violation of the terms under which the Celestial Emperor allowed her to remain in the Celestial realm, resulting in a much harsher punishment. Confined to the Moon since her imprisonment, Chang’e often wanders onto the palace balcony and gazes past the lanterns toward the mortal realm, chasing memories of her beloved husband. With the lanterns illuminating the world below, the moon’s light becomes not only a literal beacon, but also a representation of enduring hope.

Tan also describes how the novel’s world-building choices were contingent on research into historical and mythological accounts. She compiled source-accurate information on ancient Chinese archery techniques, particularly the structure of composite bows, traditional draw methods, and the ceremonial significance of archery in early Chinese courts. The coalescence of this information makes an appearance in the novel through both Xingyin’s training sequences and the characterization of Houyi. The novel also draws upon Chinese depictions of serpentine water dragons, typically associated with imperial authority and their benevolent role in Chinese folklore, to shape some of the mythic creatures in the novel. She also consulted Chinese constellations and traditional cosmology to create the geographical logic of the Celestial Realm, integrating elements like heavenly palaces, guardians, and spirit beasts.

== Reception ==
The book was ranked as one of the most anticipated books of 2022 by several magazines and literary websites including Polygon, PopSugar, Book Riot and Tor.com. It received positive critique from reviewers, including starred reviews from Publishers Weekly, Library Journal and BookPage. In their starred review, Publishers Weekly noted that "Tan paints a lush, sparkling world in her inventive reimagining of the age-old Chinese folktale. The result is a riveting page-turner that will leave fantasy lovers satisfied and eager for more". Library Journal calls the book "an exquisitely detailed fantasy with a strong, vulnerable protagonist. The intimate prose makes Tan's wonderful debut an immersive experience...". A review from Kirkus Review called the novel "A standard court fantasy, unique in its expansion on the story of the Mid-Autumn Festival". The BookPage starred review comments: "Filled with intricate world building, heartbreaking romance and mind-bending intrigue. Tan's story is mythic in its scope yet personal in its execution...The result is an all-consuming work of literary fantasy that is breathtaking both for its beauty and its suspense."

== Translations ==
As of November 2025, Daughter of the Moon Goddess has been translated into seven languages: Spanish , French , Italian, Polish , Romanian, Persian , and Slovak.

== Sequels ==
The direct sequel, Heart of the Sun Warrior, was published by Harper Voyager on August 29, 2023, and concludes Xingyin’s story and the central arc involving the Celestial Kingdom and the immortal realms.

Tan later published a companion novella set in the same universe, Tales of the Celestial Kingdom, on February 6, 2024. The novella is broken into three main sections titled Dusk, Twilight, and Dawn, and expand on events that occur between the two novels through a series of nine individual stories from the perspective of different characters.
