= Rabbit and the Moon =

1998 picture book by Douglas Wood

- Author: Douglas Wood
- Illustrator: Leslie A Baker
- Language: English
- Genre: Children's literature, picture book, Canadian folklore, American Folklore
- Published: 1998 (Simon & Schuster Books for Young Readers)
- Publication place: USA
- Media type: Print (hardback)
- ISBN: 9780689807695
- OCLC: 35095958

Rabbit and the Moon is a 1998 children's picture book by Douglas Wood and illustrated by Leslie Baker. It is an adaption of a Cree legend about how Rabbit reached the Moon, and how the Whooping crane got its long legs and red head marking.

== Reception ==
Booklist, in a review of Rabbit and the Moon, wrote "The watercolor illustrations have a fuzzy, sleepy quality, yet are clear enough that the animals depict a range of emotions .. The story itself is told in fairly short, easy-to-understand sentences, making this a good a choice for a bedtime story or for older students studying folktales." and School Library Journal called it a "satisfying story", but "An uneven offering."

Kirkus Reviews was somewhat critical, writing, "Though Wood pays homage to Rabbit as a trickster in the source note, there's no mischief in the story and Rabbit is portrayed as polite and unassuming. Baker's watercolors are another disappointment; Rabbit's limbs change length and proportions unpredictably, so that sometimes his shape is that of a natural-looking rabbit, and other times that of a human child in a fur suit."

Rabbit and the Moon has also been reviewed by The Horn Book Magazine, and Publishers Weekly.
