= Guanghan Palace =

Mythical palace on the Moon in Chinese mythology

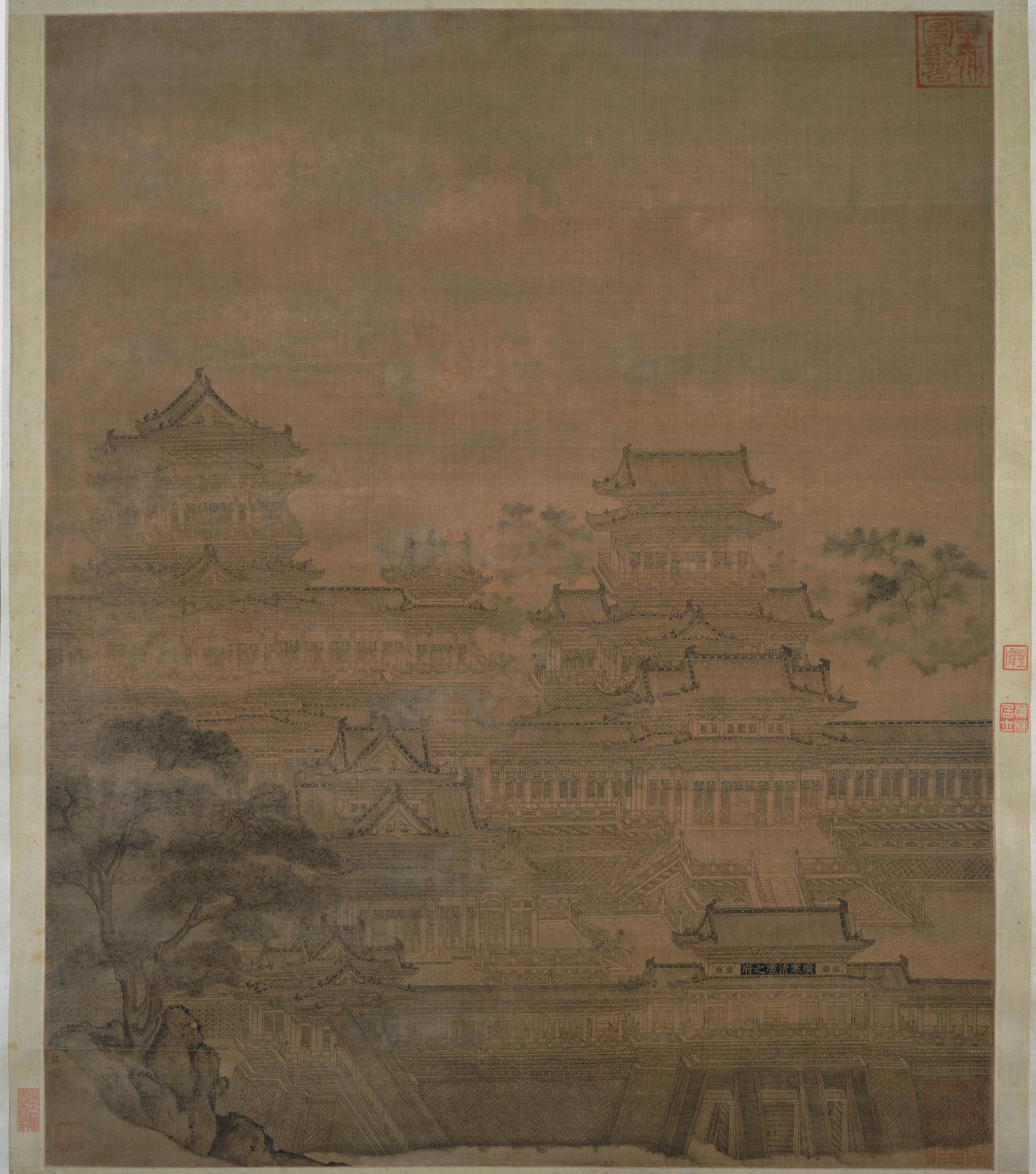
Guanghan Palace, an anonymous Yuan dynasty painting in the Shanghai Museum.

Guanghan Palace (simplified Chinese: 广寒宫; traditional Chinese: 廣寒宮; pinyin: Guǎnghán Gōng; lit. 'Palace of Vast Cold') is a mythical palace on the Moon in Chinese mythology. It is also called the Moon Palace (月宮) or Toad Palace (蟾宮). In Chinese stories, the palace is the home of Chang'e and the Jade Rabbit.

== Early mentions ==
The name Guanghan Palace appears in early Chinese literature. The Leishuo (類說) preserves a passage attributed to the Shizhou Ji (十洲記), traditionally credited to Dongfang Shuo. The passage says that after the winter solstice, the Moon nourishes its essence in Guanghan Palace.

The Tang dynasty poet Bao Rong also mentioned Guanghan Palace in his poem Su Shuiting (宿水亭). He described a night scene under the stars and Moon as being like a night spent in Guanghan Palace.

== Legends ==
=== Emperor Xuanzong's visit to the Moon ===
A story in the Longcheng Lu (龍城錄), traditionally attributed to Liu Zongyuan, tells of Emperor Xuanzong travelling to the Moon with a Daoist master and another companion. They see a great palace with the words Guanghan Qingxu Zhi Fu (廣寒清虛之府; "Palace of Vast Cold and Pure Emptiness") written above its entrance. The palace is guarded by soldiers, and the visitors cannot enter. Xuanzong then sees celestial women dressed in white dancing beneath a great cassia tree. After returning to Earth, he remembers their music and creates the Song of Neon Clothes and Feather Skirts (霓裳羽衣曲).

Another version appears in the Taiping Guangji (太平廣記). In this story, the Daoist Luo Gongyuan takes Xuanzong to the Moon during the Mid-Autumn Festival. Luo throws his staff into the sky, where it becomes a silver bridge. They cross the bridge and reach the Moon Palace, where hundreds of celestial women are dancing. Xuanzong hears the Song of Neon Clothes and Feather Skirts and remembers its tune. After returning to Earth, he orders his musicians to perform it.

== Buddhist texts ==
Buddhist texts also describe a palace on the Moon (月宮殿). In the Dirgha Agama, the Sun Palace is said to measure 51 yojana across, while the Moon Palace measures 49 yojanas. The Moon Palace is described as being made of silver and lapis lazuli, with seven walls around it. It is the home of the Moon Deva (月天子) and travels through the sky.

== In literature ==
=== Journey to the West ===
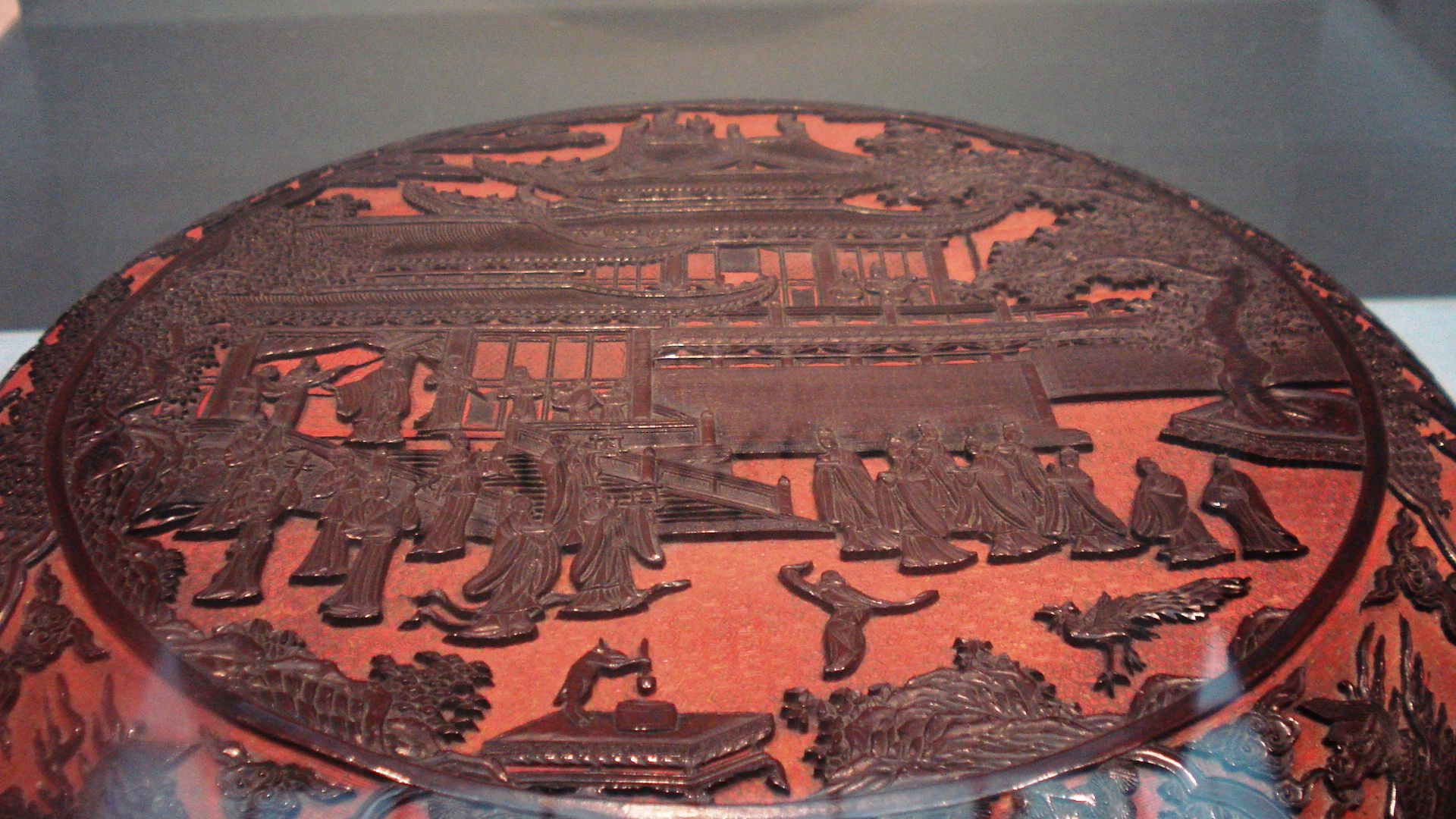
A Ming dynasty lacquered wooden box showing the Moon Palace.

Guanghan Palace appears in the Ming dynasty novel Journey to the West (Xiyou Ji). In the novel, Zhu Bajie tells Sun Wukong that he was once Marshal Tianpeng (天蓬元帥), a heavenly commander. After becoming drunk at a celestial banquet, he enters Guanghan Palace and approaches Chang'e, who refuses his advances. He is arrested and brought before the Jade Emperor. With the help of Taibai Jinxing, his death sentence is changed to two thousand blows and banishment from Heaven. He is later reborn as Zhu Ganglie (豬剛鬣).

The palace appears again in the story of the Jade Rabbit. The rabbit escapes from Guanghan Palace and takes the place of a princess in the kingdom of Tianzhu. She uses a pestle that was used to make medicine in the Moon Palace. When Sun Wukong fights her, the Moon Goddess arrives and explains that the rabbit belongs to her palace. She then takes the rabbit back to the Moon.

=== Modern literature ===
In September 1922, Guo Moruo published a fairy-tale play called Guanghan Gong (廣寒宮) in the second issue of the literary journal Chuangzao (創造). The play was one of the earliest works of modern Chinese children's theatre.

== Interpretations ==
Sun Jingming (孫敬明), a researcher at the Weifang City Museum, suggested that Guanghan Palace was originally a palace in the ancient state of Han (寒國), near present-day Hanting District in Weifang, Shandong. In his account, Han Zhuo killed Hou Yi and later married Chang'e. He then built a large palace for her. Sun explained that the name Guanghan Palace came from guang (廣, meaning "vast") and Han Palace (寒宮). He also believed that the story of Chang'e's journey to the Moon came from the Han clan's use of the Moon as its symbol.

Another study by Lü Junfeng (呂俊峰) also places the origin of the Chang'e legend in Hanting. The study uses ancient texts, local stories and historical sites to argue that the legend began in the area of the former Han state.

== In popular culture ==
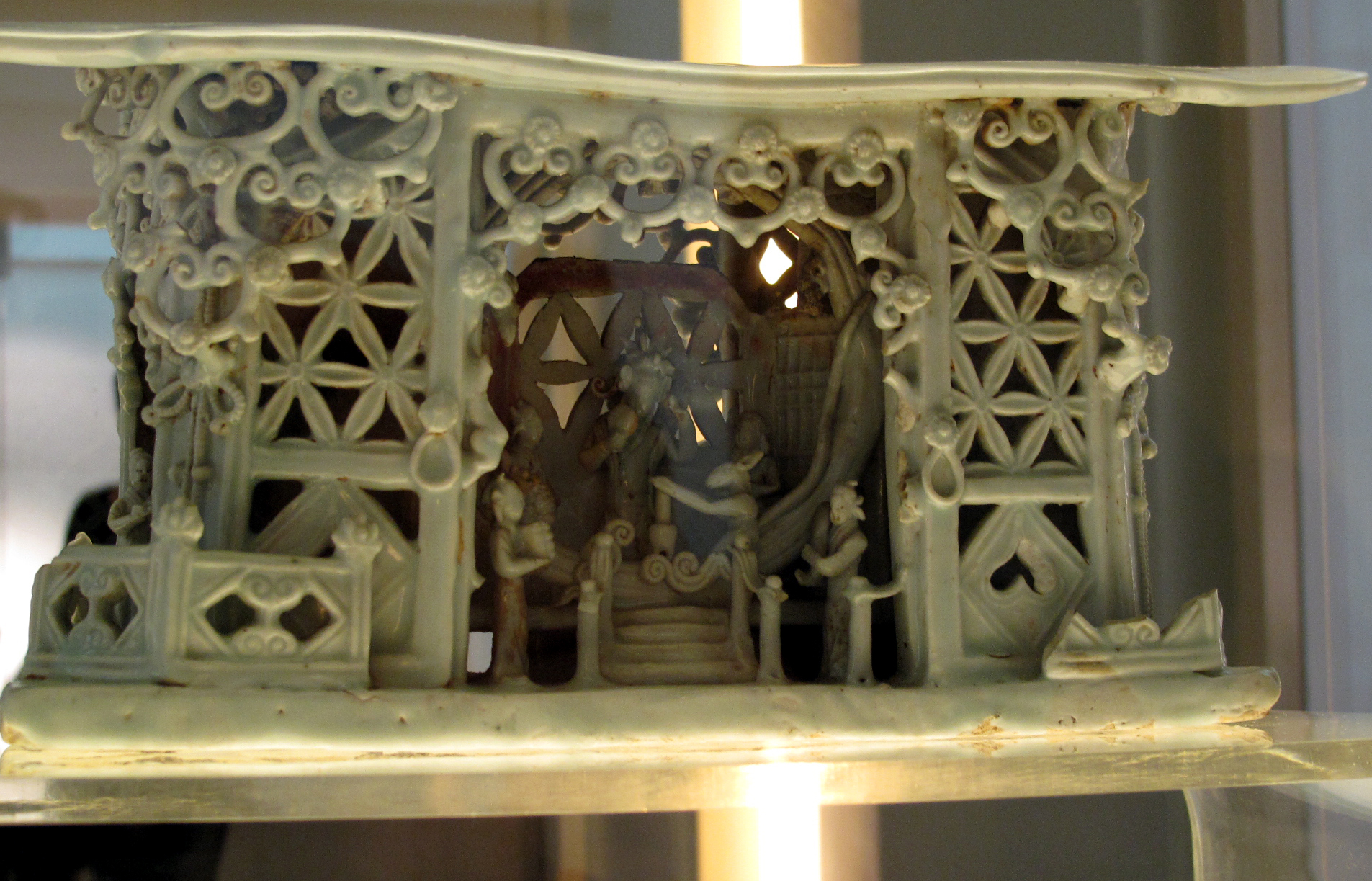
A Yuan dynasty porcelain pillow showing Guanghan Palace, Datong Museum.

In September 2021, Henan Television performed a dance called Guanghan Palace (廣寒宮) during its Mid-Autumn Wonderful Tour programme. The dance used the story of Chang'e and showed the Moon Palace, the Jade Rabbit and astronauts visiting the Moon.

The song Guanghan Palace was also used in a music project for the mobile game Fantasy Westward Journey, alongside other songs performed with Chinese classical singers.

=== Lunar feature ===
The name Guang Han Gong was given to a place on the Moon near the landing site of China's Chang'e 3 spacecraft. The International Astronomical Union approved the name on 5 October 2015. It covers the landing site and part of the route travelled by the Yutu rover. The name comes from the mythical palace where Chang'e and the Jade Rabbit live. Chinese space authorities publicly announced the name in January 2016.
