= Taiyin Xingjun =

Chinese moon goddess

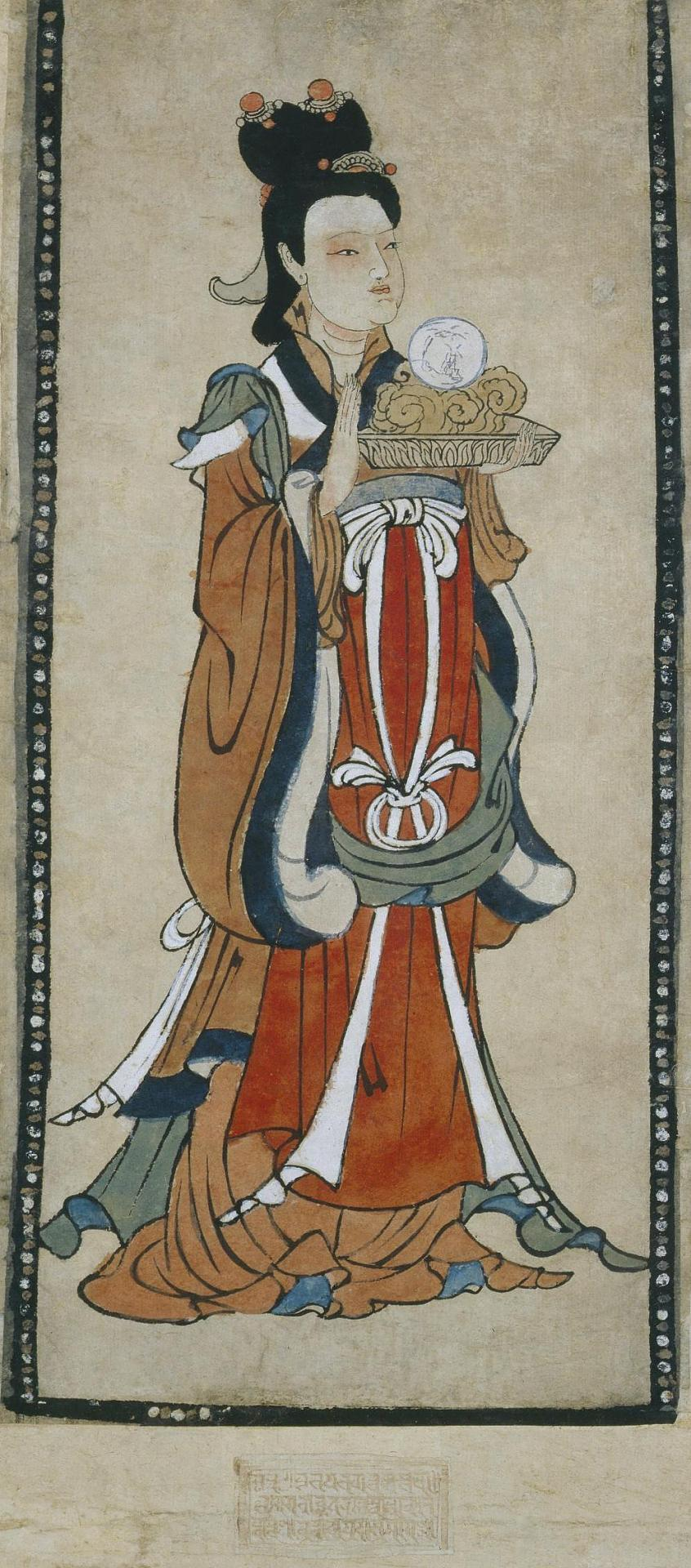
Painting of Taiyin Xingjun from the Western Xia, held by the Hermitage Museum.

Taiyin Xingjun (Chinese: 太陰星君; pinyin: Tàiyīn Xīngjūn) is the goddess of the moon in Taoism and Chinese folk religion. She is also called Taiyin Niangniang (太陰娘娘), Taiyin Yuanjun (太陰元君), and Taiyin Huangjun (太陰皇君). She is worshipped during the Mid-Autumn Festival, especially in Taiwan. Some folk traditions identify her with Chang'e, while others regard them as different figures.

== Origins and religious texts ==
The Chinese have worshipped the moon since ancient times. Emperors offered sacrifices to the sun in the east and the moon in the west. Moon worship later became part of the Mid-Autumn Festival, held on the fifteenth day of the eighth lunar month.

In Chinese cosmology, taiyin means "great yin" and is also used for the moon. Some accounts say that the sun and moon came from the left and right eyes of Pangu.

Taiyin Xingjun has several titles in Taoist texts. The Lingbao Wuliang Duren Shangjing Dafa (靈寶無量度人上經大法) calls her Taiyin Huangjun and the spirit of the Moon Palace. The Taishang Dongzhen Wuxing Mishou Jing (太上洞真五星秘授經) also describes her powers. Her full title includes Yuegong Huanghua Suyao Yuanjing Shenghou Taiyin Yuanjun (月宮黃華素曜元精聖后太陰元君). She rules Dongyin Jielin Palace (洞陰結璘宮).

The Yunji Qiqian describes the Queen Mother of the West as the original qi of Taiyin (太陰之元氣). It places her in the right eye of the human body. The text also places the sun beneath the left breast and the moon beneath the right breast.

The Gujin Tushu Jicheng also records the names Yuhua (玉華) and Jielin (羯臨) for spirits of the sun and moon. In his poem Two Ghosts (二鬼), Liu Ji tells how the Jade Emperor appointed Yuhua and Jielin to govern the sun and moon.

== Depictions ==
Taiyin Xingjun is usually shown as a woman wearing a crown and court robes. She sometimes holds a round moon or a jade tablet. The Jade Rabbit may appear beside her.

The Taishang Dongzhen Wuxing Mishou Jing describes her wearing a star crown, white robes, and red shoes. She carries a jade tablet and a golden sword decorated with seven stars.

During the Ming and Qing dynasties, people in Beijing used printed paper images called yueguang ma (月光馬) for moon worship. Some showed Taiyin Xingjun above the Moon Palace and the Jade Rabbit. Worshippers placed offerings before the pictures and burned them after the ceremony. The Yanjing Suishi Ji (燕京歲時記) records this practice.

Some of these prints are now held in museums and libraries. A Qing dynasty print from Tianjin, kept at the National Library of China, shows Taiyin Xingjun with two attendants. The Jade Rabbit stands beneath a cassia tree and prepares medicine. Another print from Hebei shows her holding a jade tablet, with an attendant and the Jade Rabbit beside her.

In Taiwan, some temples worship Taiyin Xingjun through a wooden tablet instead of a statue. The Tiantan Temple in Tainan has a tablet bearing her name. Other temples show her as a woman holding the moon. The story of Chang'e has also influenced her appearance, and she is commonly called Taiyin Niangniang or Yueniang Ma (月娘媽).

== In literature ==
=== The Legend of the Eight Immortals ===
In The Legend of the Eight Immortals (八仙得道), Taiyin Xingjun is the third daughter of the Jade Emperor. She dislikes the noise and troubles of Heaven and wants to live somewhere quiet. The Jade Emperor offers her several places, but she chooses the Moon Palace. He then makes her its ruler.

Chang'e also lives on the moon, but she is not Taiyin Xingjun. The novel describes Taiyin Xingjun as pure and fond of solitude. Chang'e is considered less pure because she had been married to Hou Yi.

=== Journey to the West ===
Taiyin Xingjun appears in Chapter 95 of Journey to the West. The Jade Rabbit has escaped from the Moon Palace and taken the place of a princess in the Kingdom of Tianzhu. When Sun Wukong discovers the rabbit's true identity, they fight. Taiyin Xingjun arrives with Chang'e and asks Sun Wukong to spare the rabbit.

She tells him that the real princess was once a moon maiden named Su'e (素娥). Su'e had struck the Jade Rabbit before being reborn as the princess. The rabbit later escaped to Earth and took revenge by kidnapping her. Taiyin Xingjun takes the rabbit back to the Moon Palace.

=== Investiture of the Gods ===
In Chapter 99 of Investiture of the Gods, Jiang Ziya appoints Queen Jiang, the former queen of King Zhou of Shang, as Taiyin Star (太陰星). Xu Gai (徐蓋) is appointed Taiyang Star (太陽星) in the same list.

== Worship ==
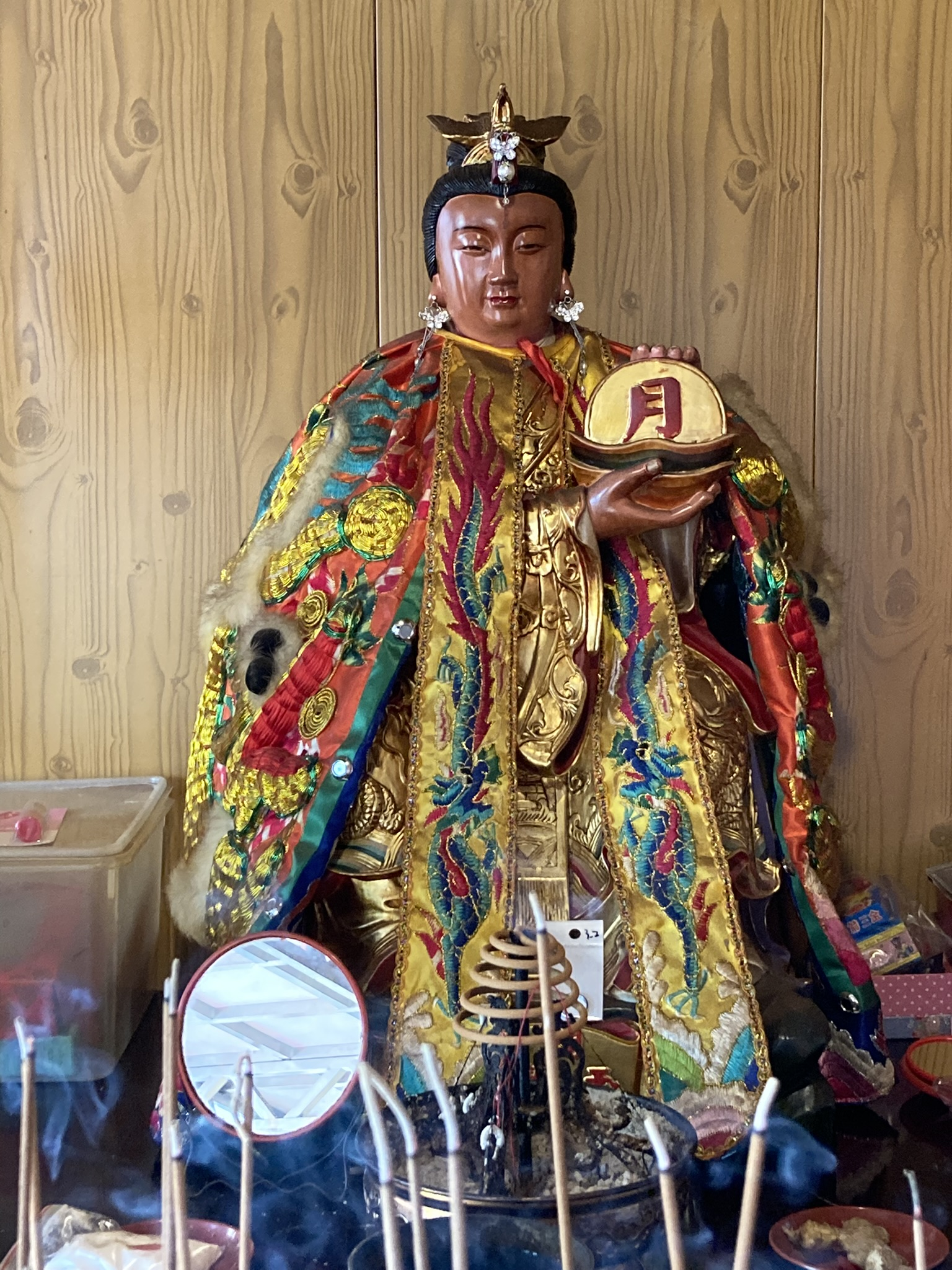
Statue of Taiyin Xingjun at Kaiji Jade Emperor Palace in Tainan, Taiwan.

Taiyin Xingjun is worshipped in Taiwan as the goddess of the moon. Her birthday is celebrated on the fifteenth day of the eighth lunar month, during the Mid-Autumn Festival. She is often worshipped with Taiyang Xingjun, the god of the sun. Both are also worshipped at temples dedicated to the Jade Emperor.

Puji Temple (普濟堂) in Daxi District, Taoyuan, holds a celebration for Taiyin Xingjun during the Mid-Autumn Festival. The temple mainly worships Guan Yu but also has shrines for Taiyin Xingjun and Taiyang Xingjun.

In Taiwanese folk belief, Taiyin Xingjun protects women and children. People pray to her for marriage, children, work, and family matters. At Kaiji Jade Emperor Palace (開基玉皇宮) in Tainan, temple staff say that she governs neiyuan (內緣) and waiyuan (外緣). Neiyuan concerns personal relationships, while waiyuan concerns work and relationships with others. Some sales workers offer cosmetics when praying to her for better relations with customers and other people.

Taiyin Xingjun is also worshipped for help with romantic relationships. Unlike Yue Lao, who is believed to bring couples together, she is sometimes asked to help people end unhappy relationships.

During the Mid-Autumn Festival, worshippers set up a table outside their homes after sunset. They offer incense, candles, mooncakes, fruit, flowers, tea, cosmetics, and paper money. Unmarried women may pray for a good marriage, while married women may pray for children. The old saying "Men do not worship the moon; women do not worship the stove" (男不拜月，女不祭灶) comes from these customs.

Some worshippers recite the True Scripture of Taiyin Xingjun (太陰星君真經). One custom calls for seven recitations during the Mid-Autumn Festival. Another calls for ten recitations on the fifteenth and sixteenth nights of each lunar month. Worshippers believe that these prayers can protect their families from illness and misfortune.
