= The Man in the Moon (nursery rhyme) =

English-language nursery rhyme

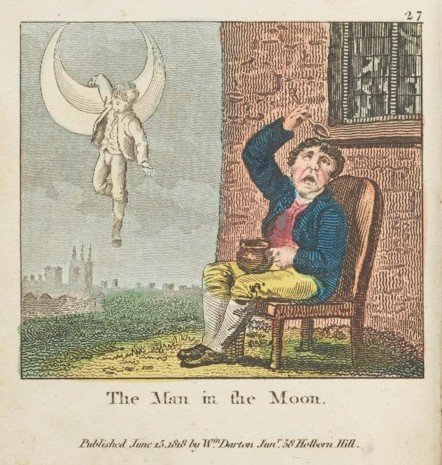
Anonymous illustration from an 1825 reprint of Songs for the Nursery

"The Man in the Moon" is an English-language nursery rhyme with the Roud Folk Song Index number of 19744. It was first published in 1784 in Gammer Gurton's Garland, a collection edited by the antiquary Joseph Ritson, and has often been reprinted. It has been adapted and parodied by George MacDonald and J. R. R. Tolkien.

== Text ==
From Gammer Gurton's Garland:

The man in the moon
Came tumbling down,
And ask'd his way to Norwich.
He went by the south,
And burnt his mouth,
With supping hot pease porridge.

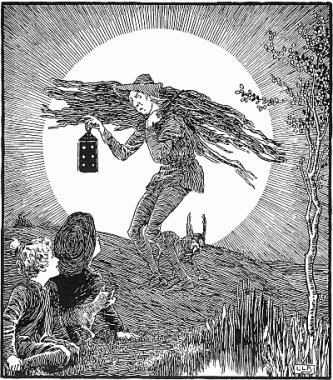
Illustration by Leonard Leslie Brooke from Andrew Lang's The Nursery Rhyme Book (1897)

From Songs for the Nursery:

The man in the moon
Came down too soon,
To ask his way to Norwich;
The man in the south,
He burnt his mouth,
With eating cold plum-porridge.

== Background ==
The man in the Moon is a character with a long history. He figures in medieval folklore as a peasant who has been banished to the Moon as a punishment for stealing thorns or brushwood. He is the subject of one of the Middle English Harley Lyrics, "Mon in the mone stond and strit", dating from c. 1300. He is also mentioned in Robert Henryson's Testament of Cresseid, in Shakespeare's The Tempest and A Midsummer Night's Dream, in two old English ballads, and in a Jacobite song. Not satisfied with this source material, Katherine Elwes Thomas, an American writer described by one modern commentator as "incomprehensibly imaginative", interpreted the nursery rhyme as a commentary on the later career of the 16th century Scottish political figure Lord Bothwell.

== Publication history ==
It is not known when the nursery rhyme was composed, although one 19th-century writer suggested that a clue might be found in the rhyme's mention, in some versions at any rate, of plum porridge, a once-popular dish superseded by plum pudding when the advent of modern cloth made its preparation possible. "The Man in the Moon" was first published in 1784 by the antiquary Joseph Ritson in his collection Gammer Gurton's Garland. Only one copy of this first edition survives. A text of the nursery rhyme with significant differences from Ritson's appeared in Songs for the Nursery (1805), and the rhyme was included in many other 19th-century collections.

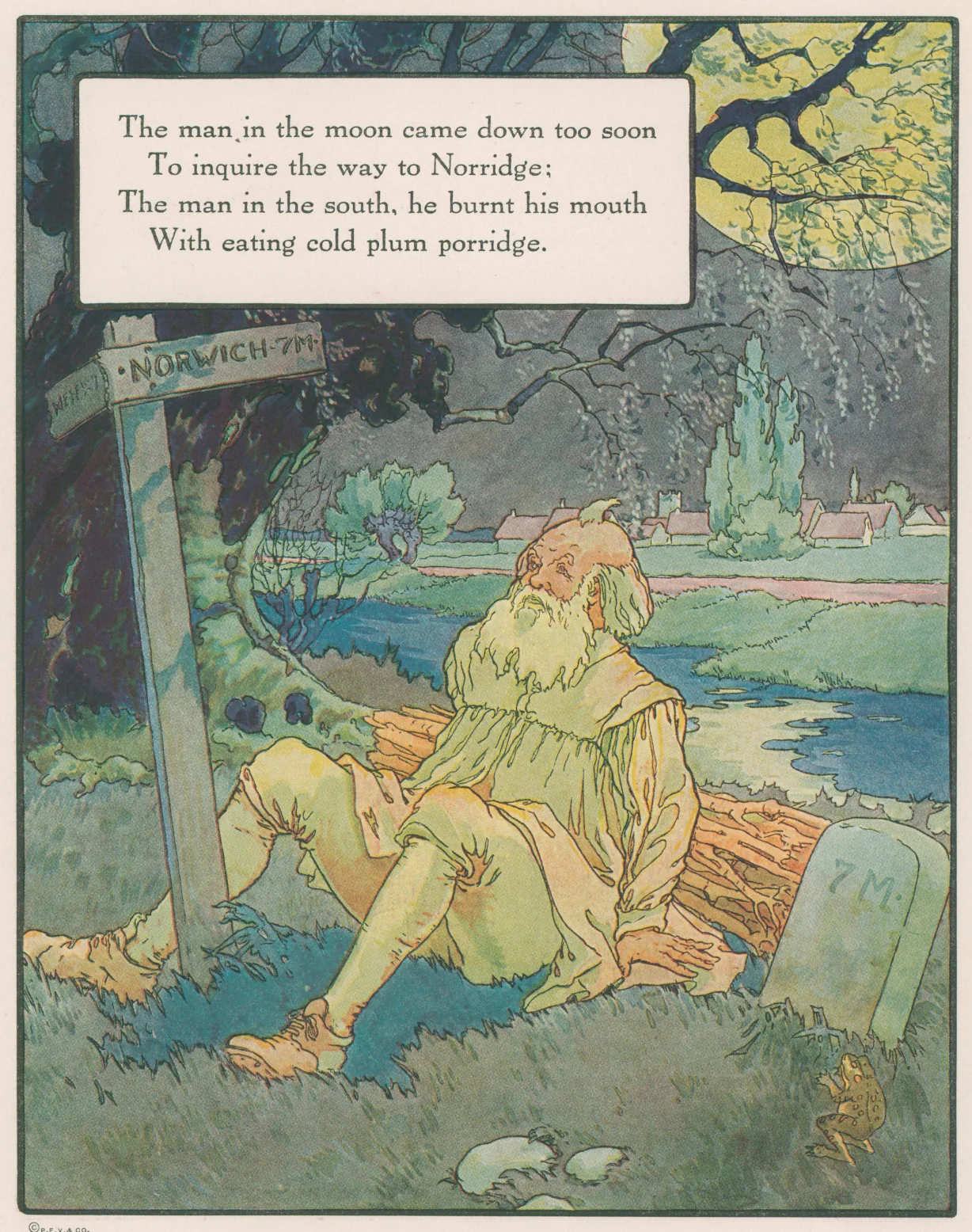
Illustration by Frederick Richardson from Eulalie Osgood Grover's Mother Goose (1915)

== Settings ==
"The Man in the Moon" is traditionally sung to a tune identified by the musicologist Frank Kidson as that of a 16th or 17th century song called "Thomas I Cannot". It has also been published with scores by Frederick W. Mills (as a vocal lancers) and James William Elliott.

== Adaptations ==
George MacDonald included in his 1871 novel At the Back of the North Wind a combined parody of "The Man in the Moon" and "The Cat and the Fiddle", which he called "The True History of the Cat and the Fiddle".

J. R. R. Tolkien wrote two poems based, in whole or in part, on "The Man in the Moon". His "Why the Man in the Moon Came Down Too Soon", written in March 1915, was, as the title suggests, a light-hearted explanation of the curious circumstances mentioned in the nursery rhyme. It was first published in 1923 in a volume called A Northern Venture, and later in a greatly revised version in his The Adventures of Tom Bombadil (1962).

Another Tolkien poem, initially titled "The Cat and the Fiddle: A Nursery Rhyme Undone and Its Scandalous Secret Unlocked" when it was first published in the periodical Yorkshire Poetry in 1923, was a similar tongue-in-cheek attempt to reconstruct a nursery rhyme's original form. Its scene is a country inn where "the Man in the Moon himself came down one night to drink his fill". Tolkien added further lines to this poem when adapting it for an appearance in The Lord of the Rings, and slightly revised it again for The Adventures of Tom Bombadil, where it was retitled "The Man in the Moon Stayed Up Too Late".
