= Lunar pareidolia =

Perception of images on the face of the Moon

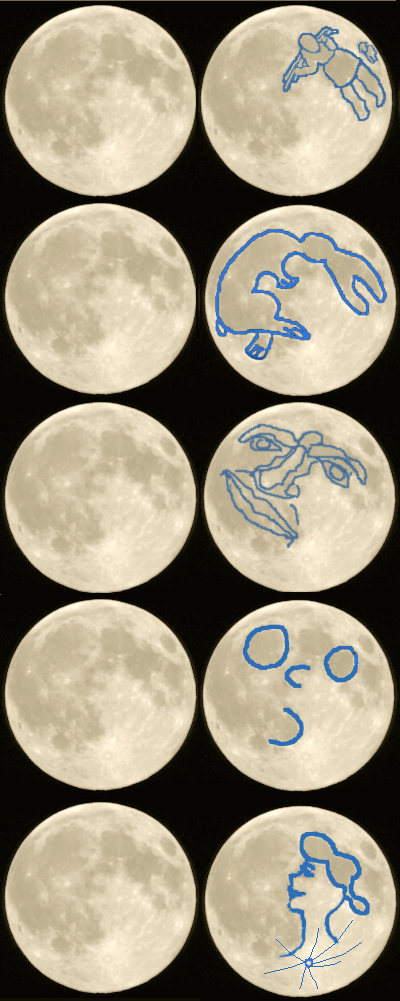
Some pareidolias drawn on the Moon

Lunar pareidolia is the perception of images on the face of the Moon. The Moon's surface is a complex mixture of dark areas (the lunar maria, or "seas") and lighter areas (the highlands); perceiving patterns in disordered visual stimuli is known as pareidolia. Being a natural element seen constantly by humans throughout the ages, many cultures have seen shapes in these dark and light areas that have reminded them of people, animals, or objects, often related to their folklore and cultural symbols; the best-known are the Man in the Moon in Western folklore and the Moon Rabbit of Asia and the Americas. Other cultures perceive the silhouette of a woman, a crow, a frog, a moose, a buffalo, or a dragon (with its head and mouth to the right and body and wings to the left) in the full moon. To many cultures of Melanesia and Polynesia, the Moon is seen to be a cook over a three-stone fire. Alternatively, the vague shape of the overall dark and light regions of the Moon may resemble a Yin Yang symbol.

== The Man in the Moon ==
The Man in the Moon is an imaginary figure resembling a human face, head, or body, that observers from some cultural backgrounds typically perceive in the bright disc of the full moon. Several versions are displayed above.

== Rabbit or hare ==
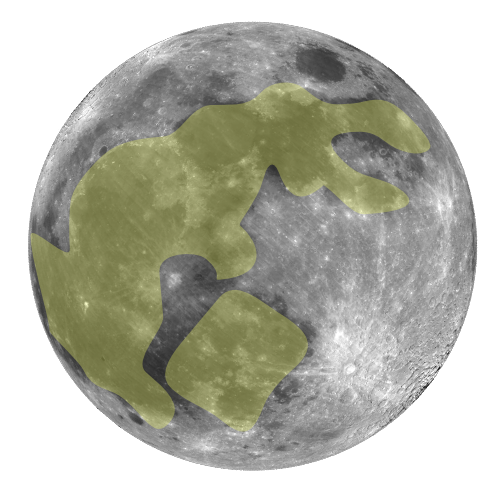
Rabbit with a pot – making medicine, mochi, or tteok

In Chinese culture, the rabbit in the Moon (a companion of Chang'e) is pounding medicine. Similarly, in Japan and Korea, popular culture sees a rabbit making mochi and tteok, respectively, in the Moon.

In Pre-Columbian Mesoamerica the rabbit is often associated with the Moon, for example, Tecciztecatl, the Aztec moon god, was pictured as an anthropomorphic rabbit. Frequently, the Maya moon goddess is represented with a rabbit in her lap. There is also a myth involving Quetzalcoatl and the Moon rabbit.

In some Akan oral traditions, an African savanna hare is believed to be the advisor of the Moon god Osranehene, and holds his Golden Stool.

== Female figures ==
In Elizabethan England, the spots of the Moon were supposed to represent a witch carrying sticks of wood on her back, or an old man with a lantern (which was illustrated by Shakespeare in his comedy A Midsummer Night's Dream).

A more recent Western image is the profile of a coiffed woman wearing a jeweled pendant, the jewel being the crater Tycho, which at full moon is very bright and has bright radiating lines (rays).

In New Zealand, the Māori legend holds that the Moon shows a woman with a local tree, the Ngaio.

In Chinese Mythology, Chang'e (various spellings) lives on the Moon. She was mentioned in the conversation between Houston Capcom and Apollo 11 crew just before the first Moon landing:

Houston: Among the large headlines concerning Apollo this morning there's one asking that you watch for a lovely girl with a big rabbit. An ancient legend says a beautiful Chinese girl called Chang'e has been living there for 4000 years. It seems she was banished to the Moon because she stole the pill for immortality from her husband. You might also look for her companion, a large Chinese rabbit, who is easy to spot since he is only standing on his hind feet in the shade of a cinnamon tree. The name of the rabbit is not recorded.
Collins: Okay, we'll keep a close eye for the bunny girl.

— NASA Capcom and Apollo 11 crew, NASA

The ancient Tagalogs see the lunar pareidolia as a face of a maiden (doncella) which they called sangmucti (sangmukti). Their name for said maiden is Colalaiyng (Kulalaying). Archbishop of Manila Felipe Pardo (1686-1688) mentioned in his inquisition report that the Tagalogs from Laguna also referred to her as “Dalágañg Binúbúkot” (Cloistered Maiden) and “Dalágañg nása Buwán” (Maiden in the Moon).

== Saint George ==
In Brazil, tradition says that the spots at the Moon's surface represent Saint George, his horse and his sword slaying the Dragon and ready to defend those who seek his help; this connection is purely Brazilian, having no known attestation in Europe, and it is believed to have originated from religious syncretism with African beliefs.

== Toad ==
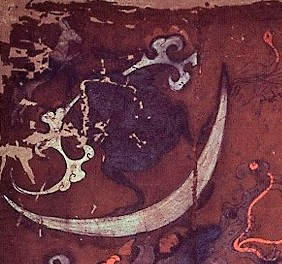
Illustration of the Chinese Moon toad, from Mawangdui silk banner from Mawangdui tomb no.1, Han dynasty.

"The toad was seen by Chinese Taoists as... the moon, representing Chang'e, the transformed wife of Yi, the excellent archer... According to Robert M. DeGraaff, in some representations of the moon-toad, the ling chih fungus is shown growing out of the creature's forehead."

== Tree ==
The Malay people living in the Malay Peninsula and Sumatra were recorded to once believe that the spots make up an inverted banyan tree (beringin songsang) under which a hunchback sits spinning rope out of tree bark that he will use to angle everything up from the Earth beneath it, but a rat will bite on the line until it snaps and the man will have to start spinning ropes once again.

== Ali ==
Shia Muslims believe that the name of Ali Ibne-Abi Talib (Muhammad's son in law) is written on the Moon. This interpretation has roots in several hadith by Muhammad where he compares Ali to the Moon and himself to the Sun. There are also other esoteric interpretations of this analogy in Islamic philosophy.

== King Mohamed V of Morocco ==
During the exile of the Moroccan royal family in Madagascar between 1953 and 1955, many Moroccans reported seeing the face of King Mohamed V on the Moon, in a sort of collective hallucination, possibly at the instigation of Moroccan nationalists who were distributing flyers with the King's image prior to that.
