= Moon rabbit =

Mythical creature in Asian and Indigenous American folklore that appears on the Moon

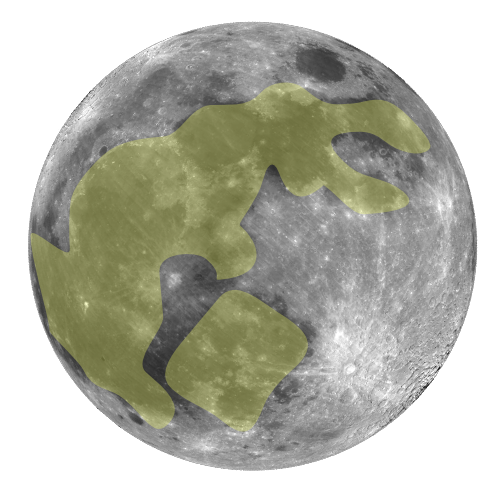
- The image of a rabbit and mortar delineated on the Moon's surface

Chinese name
- Chinese: 月兔
- Literal meaning: moon rabbit
Transcriptions
Standard Mandarin
- Hanyu Pinyin: yuètù
Yue: Cantonese
- Jyutping: jyut6 tou3

Alternative Chinese name
- Chinese: 玉兔
- Literal meaning: jade rabbit
Transcriptions
Standard Mandarin
- Hanyu Pinyin: yùtù
Yue: Cantonese
- Jyutping: juk6 tou3

Vietnamese name
- Vietnamese alphabet: thỏ ngọc
- Chữ Hán: 兔玉

Korean name
- Hangul: 달토끼
Transcriptions
- Revised Romanization: daltokki

Japanese name
- Kanji: 月の兎
Transcriptions
- Romanization: tsuki no usagi

The Moon rabbit, Moon hare or Jade rabbit is a mythical figure in both East Asian and indigenous American folklore, based on interpretations that identify the dark markings on the near side of the Moon as a rabbit or hare. In East Asian mythology, the rabbit is seen as pounding with a mortar and pestle, but the contents of the mortar differ among Chinese, Japanese, Korean, and Vietnamese folklore. In Chinese folklore, the rabbit, Yutu, is often portrayed as a companion of the Moon goddess Chang'e, constantly pounding the elixir of life for her and some show the making of cakes or rice cakes; but in Japanese and Korean versions, the rabbit is pounding the ingredients for mochi or tteok or some other type of rice cakes; in the Vietnamese version, the Moon rabbit often appears with Hằng Nga and Chú Cuội, and like the Chinese version, the Vietnamese Moon rabbit is also pounding the elixir of immortality in a mortar. In some Chinese versions, the rabbit pounds medicine for the mortals and some include making of mooncakes. Moon folklore from certain Amerindian cultures of North America also has rabbit themes and characters.

== History ==
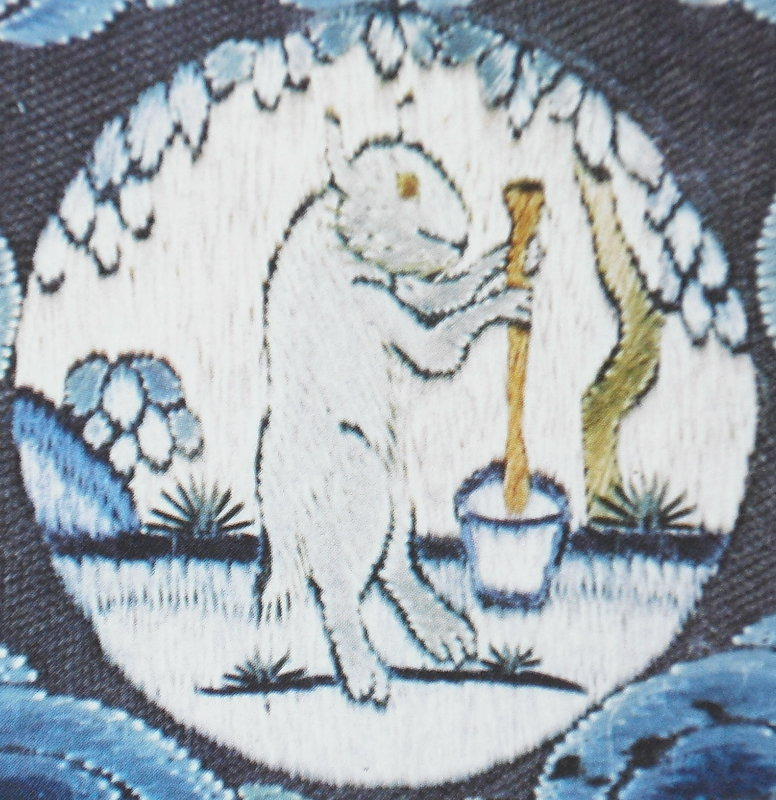
The Chinese mythological white hare making the elixir of immortality on the Moon embroidered onto an eighteenth-century Imperial Chinese robe

An early Chinese source called the Chu Ci, a Western Han anthology of Chinese poems from the Warring States period, notes that along with a toad, there is a hare on the Moon who constantly pounds herbs for the immortals. This notion is supported by later texts, including the Song-era Taiping Imperial Reader. As rabbits were not yet introduced to China during Western Han, the original image was not a rabbit but a hare.

Han dynasty poets call the hare on the Moon the "Jade Hare" (玉兔) or the "Gold Hare" (金兔), and these phrases were used often, in place of the word for the Moon. The famed Tang poet Li Bai, relates how "The rabbit in the moon pounds the medicine in vain" in his poem, "The Old Dust".

== East Asian folklore ==
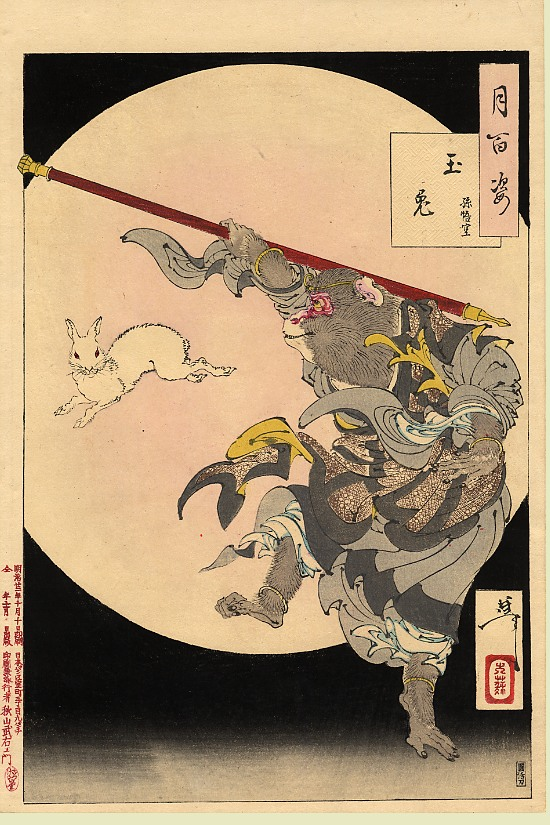
Sun Wukong fights the Moon Rabbit, a scene in the sixteenth century Chinese novel, Journey to the West, depicted in Yoshitoshi's One Hundred Aspects of the Moon

In the Buddhist Jataka tales, Tale 316 relates that a monkey, an otter, a jackal, and a rabbit resolved to practice charity on the day of the full moon (Uposatha), believing a demonstration of great virtue would earn a great reward. When an old man begged for food from them, the monkey gathered fruits from the trees and the otter collected fish, while the jackal found a lizard and a pot of milk-curd. Knowing only how to gather grass, the rabbit instead offered its own body by throwing itself into a fire the man had prepared. However, the rabbit was not burnt and the old man revealed that he was Śakra. Touched by the rabbit's virtue, he drew the likeness of the rabbit on the Moon for all to see. It is said the lunar image is still draped in the smoke that rose when the rabbit cast itself into the fire. The rabbit is believed to be a Bodhisattva.

A version of this story may be found in the Japanese anthology, Konjaku Monogatarishū, where the rabbit's companions are instead a fox and a monkey.

The Moon rabbit legend originated in China, and is popular and part of local folklore throughout Asia. It may be found in diverse cultures in China, Japan, India, Korea, Sri Lanka, Cambodia, Thailand, Vietnam, and Myanmar.

This legend also gave rise to the Mid-Autumn Festivals of China, Tết Trung Thu of Vietnam, Tsukimi of Japan, and Chuseok of Korea, and Bon Om Touk in Cambodia, all of which celebrate the legend of the Moon rabbit. In Vietnamese mythology, the Jade Rabbit on the Moon is often accompanied by the Moon Lady and Cuội, who sits under a magical banyan. The trio has become the personifications of the holiday, when they descend to the mortal world and give out cellophane lanterns, mooncakes and gifts to children.

In Journey to the West, when Tang Sanzang passes through India on his journey, a demoness wants to marry him so that she can absorb his yang essence and increase her powers. Sun Wukong sees through her disguise and fights with her. Just as Wukong is about to defeat the demoness, accompanied by the fairy Chang'e, Taiyin Xingjun descends on a colored cloud. The Monkey King hastily puts away his iron rod, saying, "Old Taiyin, where are you going? I, Sun Wukong, have been avoiding you." Taiyin replies, "The demon you are facing is the Jade Rabbit, who guards the mystical frost elixir in my Guanghan Palace. She secretly unlocked the jade gate and escaped from the palace, and it has been a year since then. I foresee she is currently in grave danger, so I have come to save her. I hope the Great Sage will spare her for my sake." Wukong reluctantly agrees, and Taiyin Xingjun takes the Jade Rabbit to the Moon and assigns her duties.

== Indigenous American folklore ==
Presumed to be arising likewise, through lunar pareidolia, legends of Moon rabbits also exist among some indigenous cultures of the Americas.

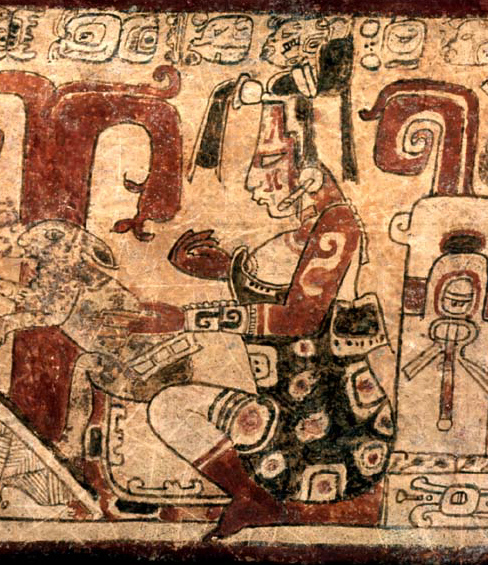
The Maya moon goddess is frequently depicted holding a rabbit

In ancient Maya art, glyphs, and inscriptions, a rabbit is frequently shown with the Moon Goddess and another deity related to the Moon.

According to an Aztec legend, the god Quetzalcoatl, then living on Earth as a human, started on a journey and, after walking for a long time, became hungry and tired. With no food or water around, Quetzalcoatl believed that he would die until a rabbit grazing nearby offered herself as food to save his life. Quetzalcoatl, moved by the rabbit's noble offering, elevated her to the Moon before returning her to Earth, imprinting her image in the Moon. He told the rabbit, "You may be just a rabbit, but everyone will remember you; there is your image in light, for all people and for all times."

In Mesoamerican legend, Nanahuatzin and Tecciztecatl sacrificed themselves to become the sun and moon, respectively, during the creation of the fifth sun. Nanahuatzin did not hesitate to sacrifice himself, but Tecciztecatl hesitated four times before finally setting himself alight to become the Moon. Due to Tecciztecatl's cowardice, the other deities believed that the Moon should not be as bright as the Sun and threw a rabbit at Tecciztecatl's face to diminish his light. Another version of the legend states that Tecciztecatl was in the form of a rabbit when he sacrificed himself to become the Moon, casting his shadow there.

In a Cree cultural legend, a young rabbit wished to ride the Moon, but only the crane was willing to take him there. The trip stretched the crane's legs, leaving them elongated. When the crane and the rabbit reached the Moon, the rabbit touched the crane with its bleeding paw, leaving a red patch on its head. In the present, all cranes retain the crane's long legs and red patch. According to the legend, on clear nights, Rabbit still may be seen riding the Moon.

== Modern references ==
=== Spaceflight ===
- The Chinese lunar rover, Yutu, that landed on the Moon on December 14, 2013 was named after the Jade Rabbit, as a result of an online poll. The rover was followed up by a second rover, Yutu-2 which deployed on the far side of the Moon on January 3, 2019.
- The Moon rabbit was the subject of a humorous conversation between NASA mission control and the crew of Apollo 11:

Houston: Among the large headlines concerning Apollo this morning, is one asking that you watch for a lovely girl with a big rabbit. An ancient legend says a beautiful Chinese girl called Chang-E has been living there for 4,000 years. It seems she was banished to the Moon because she stole the pill of immortality from her husband. You might also look for her companion, a large Chinese rabbit, who is easy to spot since he is always standing on his hind feet in the shade of a cinnamon tree. The name of the rabbit is not reported.
Michael Collins: Okay. We'll keep a close eye out for the bunny girl. (Note: NASA transcripts had attributed the response to Aldrin (Apollo 11 Technical Air-to-Ground Voice Transcription. National Aeronautics and Space Administration. Page 179), but corrected NASA transcripts attribute it to Collins.)

=== Arts ===
==== Comics and animation ====
- The eponymous Sailor Moon's human name is Usagi Tsukino, a pun on 月のうさぎ (Rom. Tsuki no usagi), which means Moon Rabbit in Japanese. Her daughter's name, Chibiusa, means small lady, however this is a play on words as her name is close to being chibi usagi which means small rabbit.
- The central antagonist of the final arc of Naruto, Kaguya Ōtsutsuki, is partially based on the Moon Rabbit, according to which a rabbit can be seen in the markings of the Moon, brewing the Elixir of Life for the Moon Goddess.
- The Moon rabbit theme makes an appearance in the "Legend of the Stars" section of the Kamen Rider Spirits manga, told by Sergei Koribanof to his son Masim.
- In the Dragon Ball animation, Son Goku fights against the Rabbit Gang and solves the issue presented in the episode by taking the enemy leader, Monster Carrot, an anthropomorphic rabbit who turns anyone he touches into a carrot, and his human companions, to the Moon, where they are seen pounding rice cake mixture.
- In the Problem Children Are Coming from Another World, Aren't They? anime, the character Black Rabbit is a Moon rabbit, with several references to the legends.
- In the film Over the Moon, there is a rabbit called 'Jade' and he is the companion of the goddess Chang'e.
- In the manga Thus Spoke Kishibe Rohan - Episode 4: The Harvest Moon a supernatural creature by the name of The Moon Rabbit (月の兎 Tsuki no Usagi) is responsible for the curse of the Mochizuki family.
- In the 60th episode of the anime Saint Seiya, Shiryu remembers an old fable of a rabbit sacrificing its life to save a traveler.
- In the Korean webcomic The God of Highschool the Moon rabbit is one of the four pillars of fate.
- An episode of Flower Witch Mary Bell has the protagonists taking a trip to the Moon, which is inhabited by a kingdom of anthropomorphic rabbits, in order to solve the animosity between their King and Queen because it's negatively influencing couples on Earth as well.
- The Japanese anime Madö King Granzört has characters who are humanoids with rabbit ears and they are natives of the Moon.
- In the manga and anime My Hero Academia, Rumi Usagiyama, also known as Mirko, is a hero who possesses rabbit-like ears and enhanced leg strength. Her Hero outfit prominently features a crescent moon symbol on its chest, and her ultimate attack names all start with the word "Luna".
- In One Piece, a rabbit character traveling with the Strawhats named Carrot can transform into a 'Sulong' rabbit with long hair and tail by looking at a full moon.
- In Sagwa, the Chinese Siamese Cat there is an episode called "The Jade Rabbit" where Sagwa and Fu-Fu imagine themselves within a variation of the story about the character being a rabbit green like jade who works making mooncakes for a tyrant after being separated from his friend, the Moon Princess.
- In the film Doraemon: Nobita's Chronicle of the Moon Exploration, Luca and Luna Tsukino are two characters who possess rabbit-like features and live on the moon alongside 9 other children. Similarly to Usagi Tsukino, their last name is a pun on 月の (Rom. Tsuki no), which translates to "of the moon" from Japanese.

==== Literature ====
- In a scene in the sixteenth century Chinese novel, Journey to the West, Sun Wukong fights the Moon Rabbit.
- Douglas Wood wrote Rabbit and the Moon (1998), an adaption of the Cree legend.

==== Live-action television ====
- The kaiju Lunaticks is based on the Moon Rabbit. He appears in the Tokusatsu series, Ultraman Ace as one of the series' 'Terrible-Monsters' under the command of its main antagonist, Yapool. Lunaticks's connection to the Moon Rabbit is further highlighted when it is revealed that he was responsible for draining the Moon of its magma (which was also the home of one of Ace's co-hosts, Yuko Minami), transforming it into a barren wasteland.
- In Chinese TV series You Are My Glory, the name of the main character, Yu Tu, is a pun on Yutu, the Chinese name of the moon rabbit. The Yutu moon rover is also mentioned multiple times in the series.

==== Music ====
- The American electronic music act, Rabbit in the Moon, founded in 1991, gets its name from this legend.
- Singer/composer Cosmo Sheldrake references "[t]he rabbit in the moon" in his song, "The Moss."
- The German band, Tarwater, released the albums Rabbit Moon and Rabbit Moon Revisited.
- The American emo act, Jets to Brazil, has a song "Perfecting Loneliness" that features the Apollo recording discussing the legend.
- The British band Happy Graveyard Orchestra published "The Moon Rabbit", a mini suite inspired by the folklore, in 2015.
- The Italian band, Moonlight Haze, has a song "The Rabbit of the Moon", inspired by the Japanese legend.
- English musician David Bowie wore a jumpsuit portraying Moon rabbits designed by Kansai Yamamoto during his Ziggy Stardust Tour.
- American singer-songwriter Clairo references "the rabbit moon" in her song, Reaper.
- Korean boy band, Big Bang references the tale of the rabbit on the moon in their music video "Still Life"
- Telugu song 'Chandrullo unde kundelu' from the movie Nuvvostanante Nenoddantana references the rabbit on the moon.
- The music video for the song "●utlaws" (Japanese: 「㋰責任集合体」) by vocal synth producer masarada (Japanese: マサラダ) is animated with frequent depictions of humanoid rabbit silhouettes and the moon.

==== Stage ====
- The rabbit in the Moon is a major theme in the 2011 musical, South Street, with the rabbit appearing prominently in the Moon clock in Sammy's bar, and the main character being advised to "Look to the rabbit" for inspiration.

==== Video games ====
- Many video games have major characters based on the tale, including Reisen Udongein Inaba and the other Lunarians (some of whom pound Moon mochi to be made into magic medicine) from the Touhou Project series, the Broodals from Super Mario Odyssey, and Chang'e and the Jade Rabbit/Moon Rabbit are featured as playable characters in the video game Smite. In Final Fantasy IV, the myths serve as the inspiration for a race of rabbit-like humanoid inhabitants of the Moon called Hummingways which, in turn, are the inspiration for the Loporrit race in Final Fantasy XIV: Endwalker, also inspired by the Moon rabbits. According to Morio Kishimoto, the plot for Sonic Frontiers was inspired by the tale.
- The Jade Rabbit is the name of a scout rifle in the Destiny series of games. In Destiny 2, players can visit the Moon and find miniature statues of chibi-styled jade rabbit dolls which accept offerings of rice cake.
- A Moon Rabbit Cookie was added to Cookie Run: Kingdom on September 17, 2021. This character was originally from LINE/Kakao Cookie Run. They also appeared in Cookie Run: Ovenbreak. This character likes rice cakes.
- The Moon Rabbit Dragon is a dragon in the dragon breeding game Dragon Mania Legends.
- In Ōkami, the god of the moon and the brush technique Crescent (which summons the moon in the sky and changes the time to night) is Yumigami, a rabbit based on the legend.
- Moon rabbits play a large role in the indie game To the Moon in which one of the main characters, River Wyles, consistently makes origami rabbits throughout the game. One origami rabbit is blue and yellow, referring to an event within the game where a young River Wyles refers to the moon as being a rabbit's stomach, with the constellations around it forming the head, ears and paws.
- The Ubisoft characters "Rabbids" are said to be from the moon.
- Zero Escape: Virtue's Last Reward features a rabbit as its main mascot and overseer of the Nonary game, known as Zero III. Zero III can be seen wearing traditional Chinese attire which could be referencing Chang'e and Moon Rabbits as near the end of the game, the player finds out that the facility the characters are locked in is located on the moon.
- Animal Crossing: New Horizons has a rabbit villager named Ruby whose house is space-themed, and features a large moon prominently.
- In Kemono Friends 3, the Moon Rabbit appears as a playable character.
- In Rhythm Tengoku, the minigame Bunny Hop has you play as a bunny bouncing on whales and turtles while trying to get back to the moon. At the end, there is a symbol of the Moon Rabbit pounding Mochi.

== See also ==
- List of fictional rabbits and hares
- List of lunar deities
- Lunar mare
- Lunar pareidolia
- Man in the Moon
- Rabbits and hares in art
- Rabbits in culture and literature
- Tecciztecatl
- Tu'er Ye
