= Chang'e =

Chinese Moon goddess

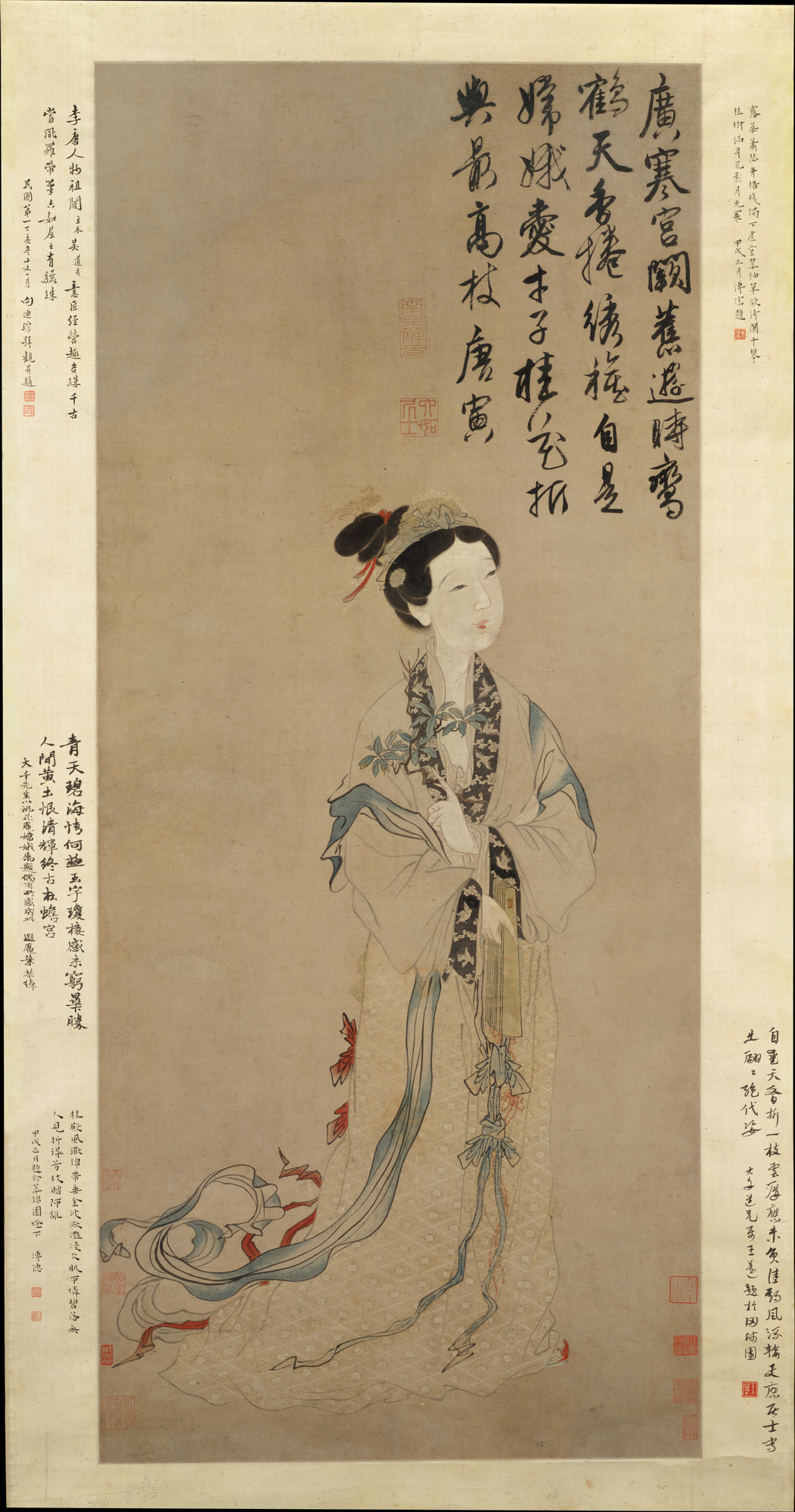
- The painting The Moon Goddess Chang E, dated to around 1500 (Ming dynasty)
- Chinese: 嫦娥
- Literal meaning: Chang the Beautiful
Transcriptions
Standard Mandarin
- Hanyu Pinyin: Cháng'é
- Wade–Giles: Ch‘ang^{2}-ê^{2}
- Yale Romanization: Cháng-é
- IPA: [ʈʂʰǎŋ.ɤ̌]
Gan
- Romanization: Song4 ngo4
Yue: Cantonese
- Yale Romanization: Sèuhng-Ngòh
- Jyutping: Soeng^{4}-Ngo^{4}
- IPA: [sœŋ˩ ŋɔ˩]
Southern Min
- Hokkien POJ: Siông-ngô͘
Middle Chinese
- Middle Chinese: /d͡ʑɨɐŋ ŋɑ/
Old Chinese
- Zhengzhang: /*djaŋ ŋaːl/

Heng'e
- Chinese: 姮娥
- Literal meaning: Heng the Beautiful
Transcriptions
Standard Mandarin
- Hanyu Pinyin: Héng'é
- Wade–Giles: Hêng^{2}-ê^{2}
Yue: Cantonese
- Jyutping: Hang4 Ngo4
Southern Min
- Hokkien POJ: Sò͘-ngô͘

In Chinese mythology, Chang'e (/ˈtʃɑːŋ.ə/ CHAHNG-ə; Chinese: 嫦娥; pinyin: Cháng'é), originally called Heng'e (姮娥; Héng'é), is the goddess of the Moon and wife of Hou Yi, the great archer. Renowned for her beauty, Chang'e is also known for ascending to the Moon with her pet Yu Tu, the Moon rabbit and living in the Moon Palace (廣寒宮). She is one of the most prominent goddesses in Chinese folk religion, Chinese Buddhism, Confucianism, and Taoism. In modern times, Chang'e is the namesake of the Chinese Lunar Exploration Program.

== Origins and descriptions ==
Chang'e first appeared in Guicang, a divination text written during the Zhou Dynasty (1046 BC – 256 BC). From the few preserved fragments of the text, it mentions "Yi shoots the ten Suns", and "Chang'e ascending to the moon." Chang'e—originally named Heng'e (姮娥)—was renamed to avoid the taboo on sharing names with the Han dynasty emperor Liu Heng.

The early text Classic of Mountains and Seas mentions "a woman is bathing the moon; she is Chang Xi, the wife of Emperor Jun. She has given birth to twelve moons, and only then does she begin to bathe the moon" (有女子方浴月，帝俊妻常羲生月十二，此始浴之。). The name "Chang Xi" in this text refers to "Chang'e" since the pronunciation of "e (娥)" is identical to "xi (羲)" in ancient Chinese.

The famous late Tang Dynasty (618–907) poet, Li Shangyin, wrote the poem "Chang'e" based on the story of Chang'e stealing the immortal elixir. Like this goddess, the poet discovers a connection in the solitude of moonlight, sensing their shared loneliness while gazing at the night sky. Among the hundreds of poems around Chang'e and the Moon, she gradually evolved into a symbol of nostalgia and solitude for numerous poets beyond Li.

The original poem in Traditional Chinese:

嫦娥

雲母屏風燭影深，長河漸落曉星沉。

嫦娥應悔偷靈藥，碧海青天夜夜心。

A translation by Witter Bynner, in his book The Jade Mountain:

To the Moon Goddess

Now that a candle-shadow stands on the screen of carven marble

And the River of Heaven slants and the morning stars are low,

Are you sorry for having stolen the potion that has set you

Over purple seas and blue skies, to brood through the long nights?

During the Ming and Qing dynasties (Ming: 1368–1644, Qing: 1644–1911), with the flourishing of urban literature, the image of Chang'e gradually became more secularized. In the novel Journey to the West (1592), Chang'e is a title that refers to the celestial maidens in the Moon Palace, and it is the Weathervane Marshal who teases the Niche Dress Fairy, not Chang'e. In Strange Stories from a Chinese Studio (1766), while Chang'e remains a celestial being from heaven, her character undergoes a transformation as she descends to the mortal realm, shedding her divinity.

== Myth ==
=== Tales ===
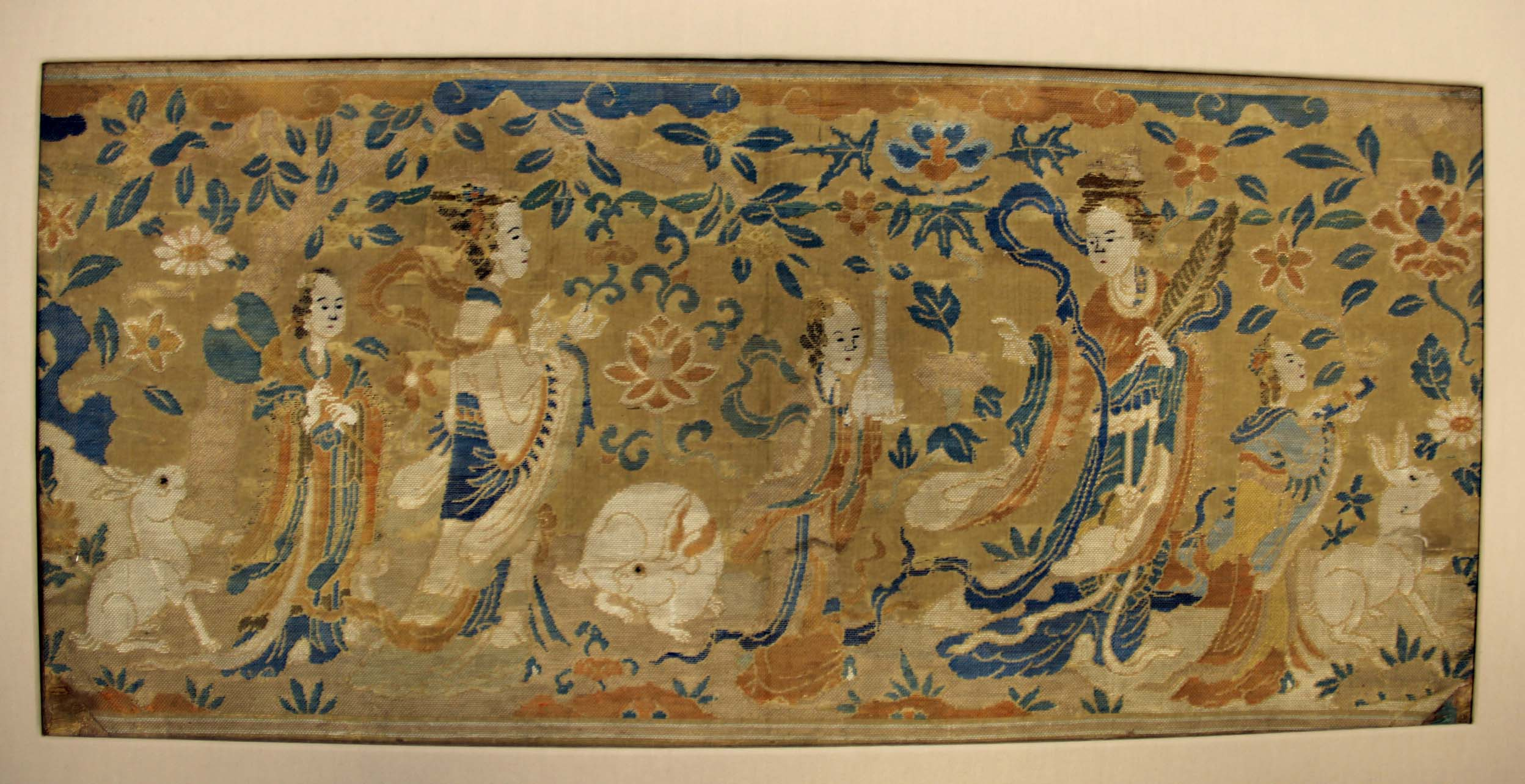
The ornate style of clothing worn by these four women suggests they are Immortals. The osmanthus leaf held by the largest figure, at the right, identifies her as the Moon Goddess Chang’e, who inhabits her celestial palace along with a rabbit that prepares the elixir of long life.

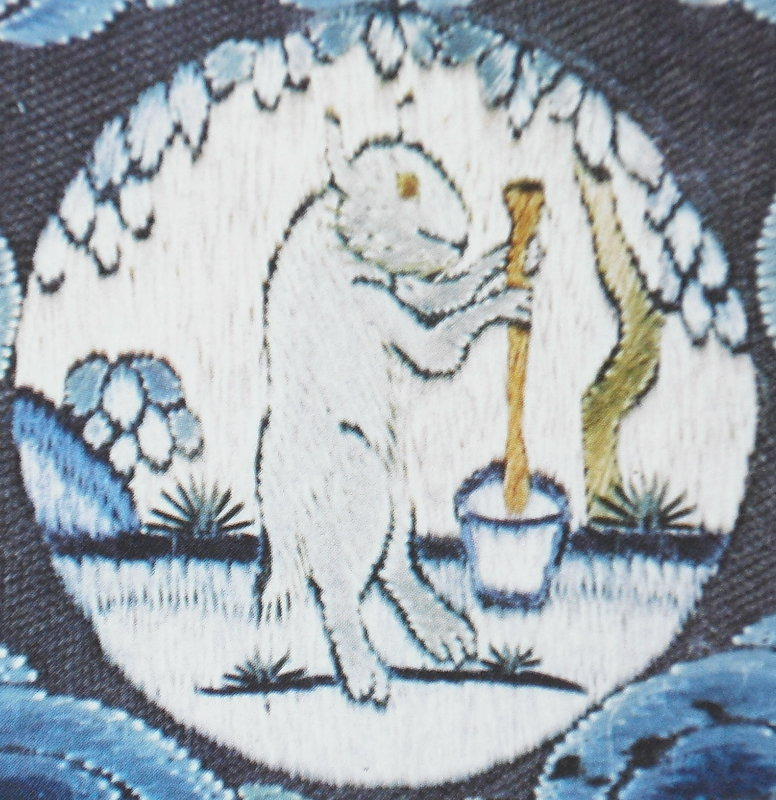
The jade rabbit lived on the Moon preparing the elixir of life.

There are many tales about Chang'e, including a well-known story about her that is given as the origin of the Mid-Autumn Festival.

In a very distant past, Chang'e was a beautiful woman. Ten suns had risen together into the skies and scorched the Earth, thus causing hardship for the people. Hou Yi, a legendary archer and the husband of Chang'e, shot down nine of them, leaving just one Sun, and was rewarded with two portions of the elixir of immortality. As he did not want to gain immortality without his beloved wife, Hou Yi waited to consume the elixir and left it with his wife, Chang'e. While Hou Yi went hunting, his apprentice Fengmeng broke into his house and tried to force Chang'e to give him the elixir, so Chang'e took both portions herself rather than giving them up to Fengmeng. Then, Chang'e flew upward past the heavens, choosing the Moon to be her immortal residence as she loved her husband and wished to live near him. When Hou Yi discovered what transpired, he felt responsible for Chang'e, so he displayed the fruits and cakes that his wife had enjoyed, then killed himself.

In older versions of the story, Chang'e stole the elixir from Hou Yi, drank it, and flew to the Moon so that her husband could not go after her.

=== In other depictions ===
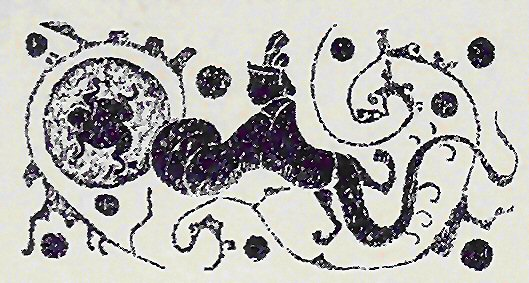
Chang'e flying to the Moon in Han dynasty stone reliefs

Chang'e also appears in Wu Cheng'en's late 16th-century novel, the Journey to the West. Here, she is said to live in the Guǎng Hán Gōng (廣寒宮; 'Vast-Cold Palace'), located upon the Moon. During a heavenly festival of immortal peaches (after Sun Wukong's banishment), the heavenly official (a Canopy Marshal named Heavenly Tumbleweed) who would become Zhu Bajie, became heavily drunk, saw the goddess Chang'e, and attempted to force himself on her, only to be prevented and reported for this act. He was reincarnated as a boar/man beast-monster, who would later be recruited by the bodhisattva, Guanyin, as a guardian for Tang Sanzang as he went on his pilgrimage to India for the Tripitaka scriptures. Later into the story, the goddess Chang'e's pet, the Jade Rabbit, became an antagonist and had to be retrieved by Chang'e and Taiyin Xingjun before Sun Wukong killed the rabbit.

== Space travel ==
Chang'e was mentioned in a conversation between Houston CAPCOM and the Apollo 11 crew just before the first Moon landing in 1969:

Ronald Evans (CC): Among the large headlines concerning Apollo this morning, there's one asking that you watch for a lovely girl with a big rabbit. An ancient legend says a beautiful Chinese girl named Chang-O has been living there for 4,000 years. It seems she was banished to the Moon because she stole the pill of immortality from her husband. You might also look for her companion, a large Chinese rabbit, who is easy to spot since he is always standing on his hind feet in the shade of a cinnamon tree. The name of the rabbit is not reported.
Michael Collins (CMP): Okay. We'll keep a close eye out for the bunny girl. (Note: NASA transcripts had attributed the response to Aldrin (Apollo 11 Technical Air-to-Ground Voice Transcription. National Aeronautics and Space Administration. Page 179), but corrected NASA transcripts attribute it to Collins (Woods, W. David; MacTaggart, Kenneth D.; O'Brien, Frank. "Day 5: Preparations for Landing". The Apollo 11 Flight Journal. National Aeronautics and Space Administration. Retrieved 26 June 2018.))

The International Astronomical Union has assigned the name Chang-Ngo to a small impact crater on the Moon.

In 2007, China launched its first lunar probe, a robotic spacecraft named Chang'e 1 in the Goddess' honor. A second robotic probe, named Chang'e 2, was launched in 2010. A third Chang'e spacecraft, called Chang'e 3, landed on the Moon on 14 December 2013, making China the third country to achieve such a feat after the former Soviet Union and the United States. The lander also delivered the robotic rover Yutu ("Jade Rabbit") to the lunar surface. On 3 January 2019, Chang'e 4 touched down on the far side of the Moon and deployed the Yutu-2 rover. Likewise all Chinese landers since then are named as Chang'e.

== In popular culture ==
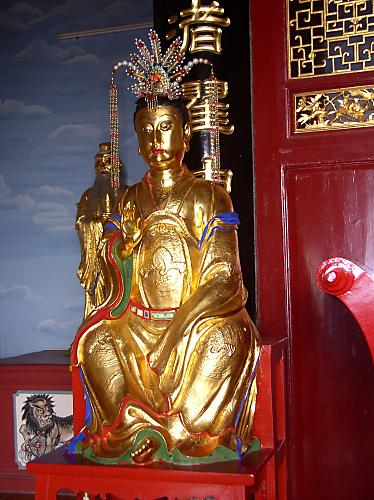
Statue of Chang'e; Temple of the Jade Emperor (Thni Kong Tnua) in Penang, Malaysia. On the evening of the Moon Festival, an altar is erected outside the temple before the goddess; it blesses the clothing or hair accessories placed there and gives beauty and love to their owners.

The original plotline and inspiration of Naoko Takeuchi's Sailor Moon is inspired by the legend of Chang'e (and Nayotake-no-Kaguya-hime from The Tale of the Bamboo Cutter and the myth of Selene and her mortal-turned-immortal lover, Endymion from Classical Greco-Roman Mythology). The titular character is a princess of the Moon while her love interest is from Earth; her reincarnation's civilian identity's name is "Usagi Tsukino" (a pun on the "Rabbit on the Moon").

In the video game series Touhou Project, Chang'e is the mysterious sworn enemy of Junko, the final boss of the 15th game Legacy of Lunatic Kingdom.

Chang'e and her story is the main theme of the 2020 American-Chinese animated feature film Over the Moon produced by Netflix. The goddess is voiced by Phillipa Soo.

Chang'e and her story was reimagined in the 2022 fantasy novel Daughter of the Moon Goddess by Sue Lynn Tan.

Australian psychedelic rock band King Gizzard & the Lizard Wizard included the track "Chang'e", containing elements of her story, on their 2023 album The Silver Cord. They reference her again in the song "Mirage City" on their 2024 album Flight b741.

== Gallery ==
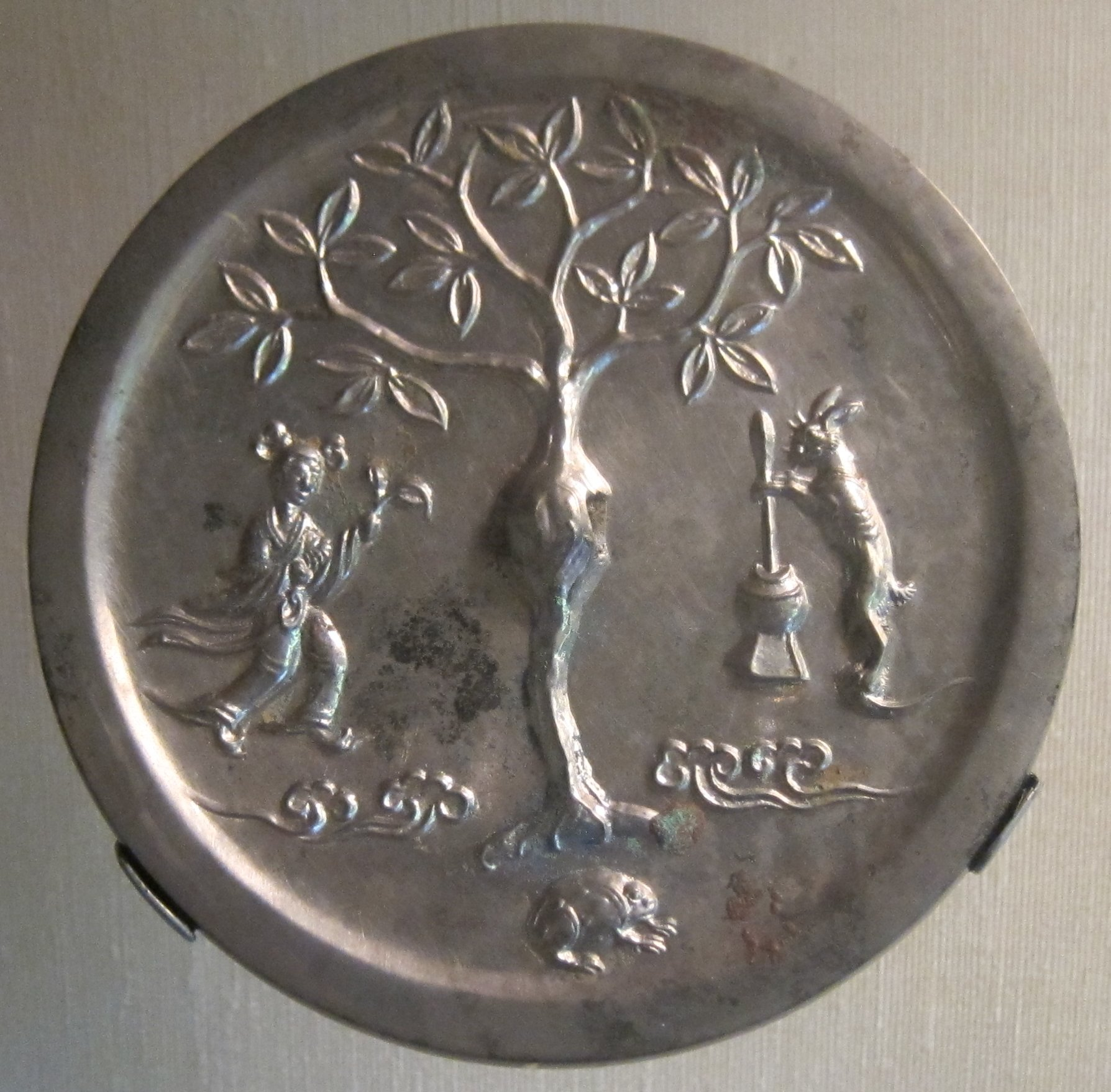
Tang dynasty bronze mirror with Chang'e and moon rabbit, Honolulu Museum of Art

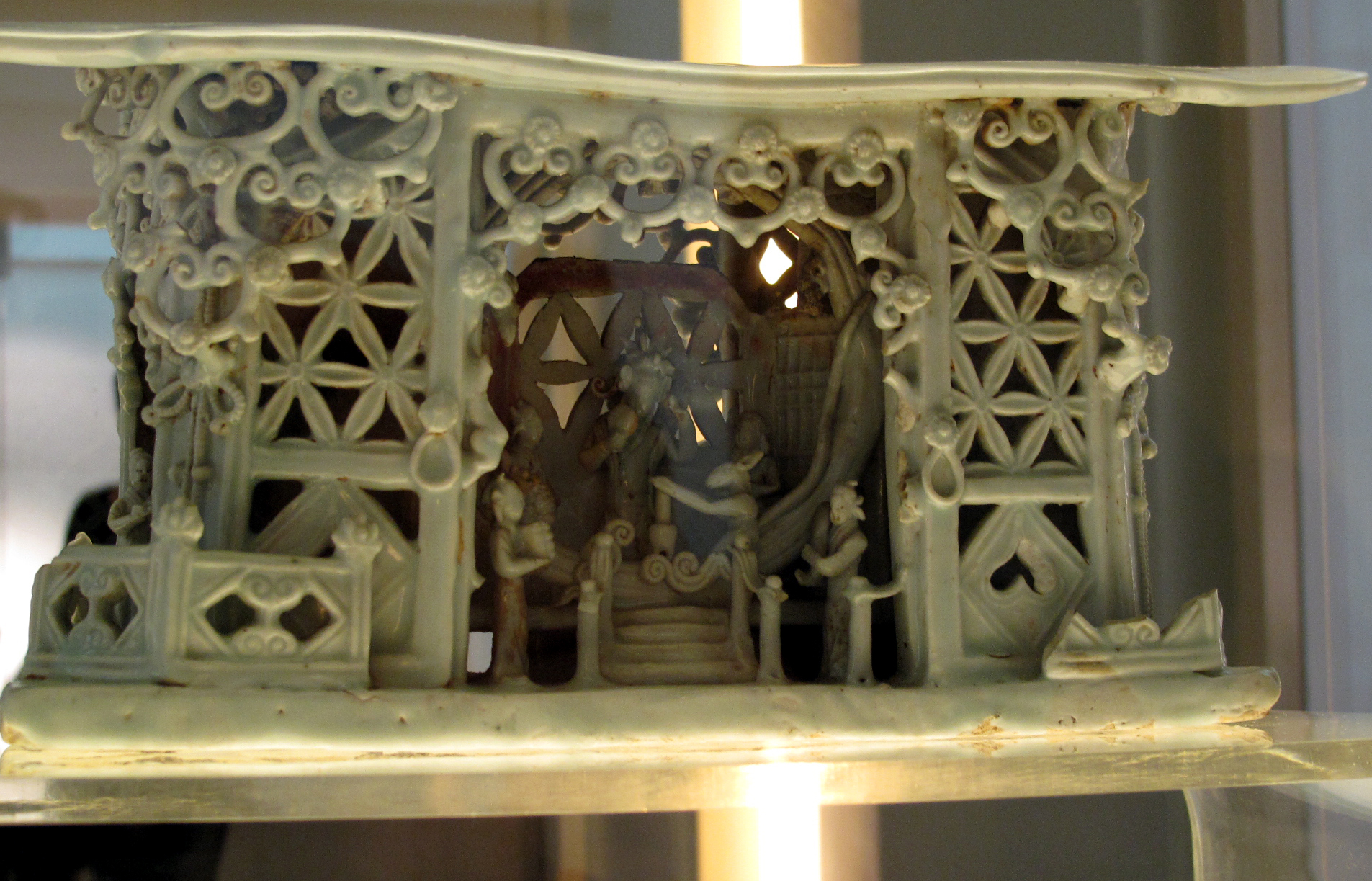
Porcelain pillow of Guanghan Palace in Yuan dynasty, collected in Datong Museum

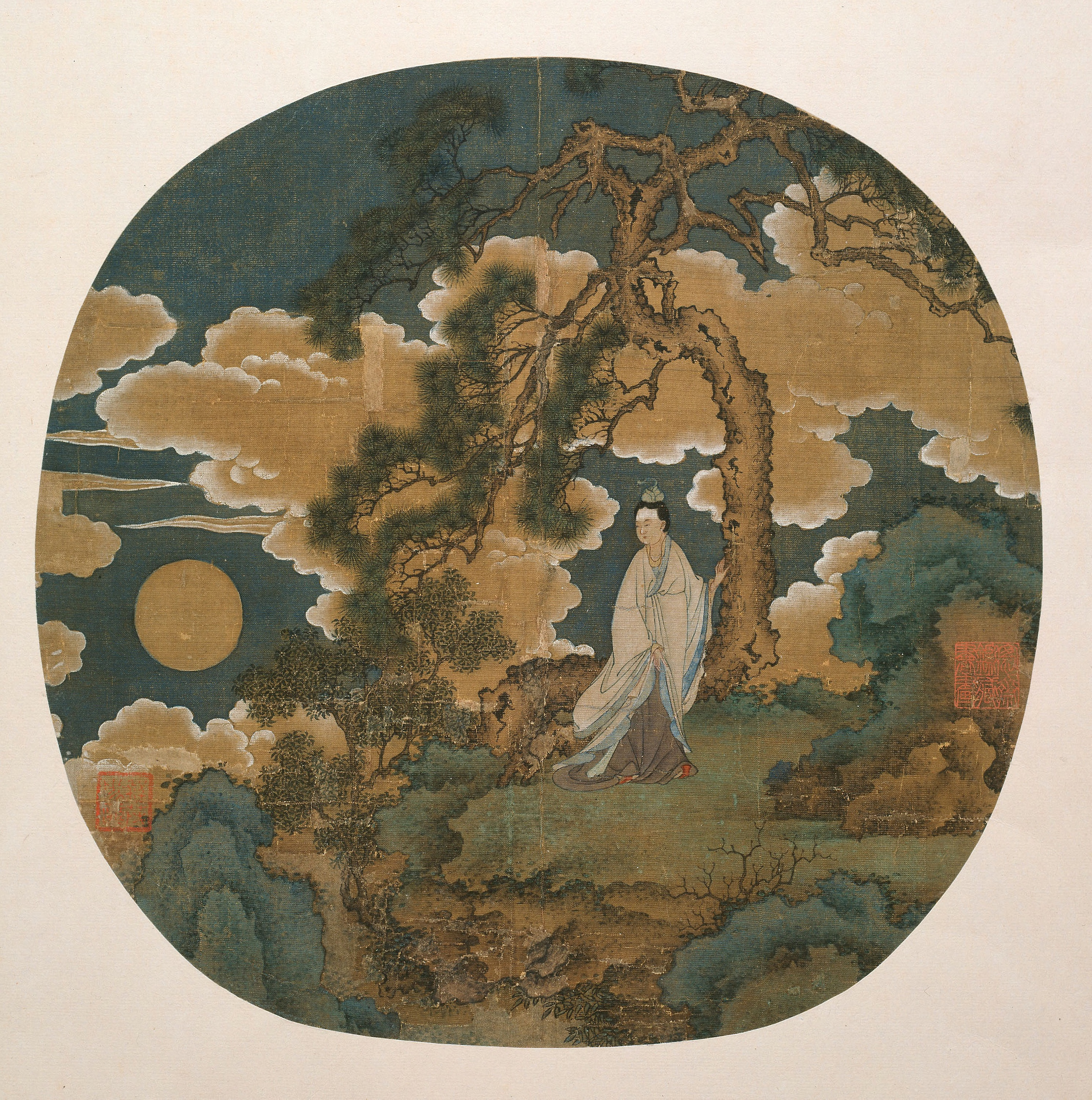
Fan map of Chang'e in Yuan or early Ming dynasty

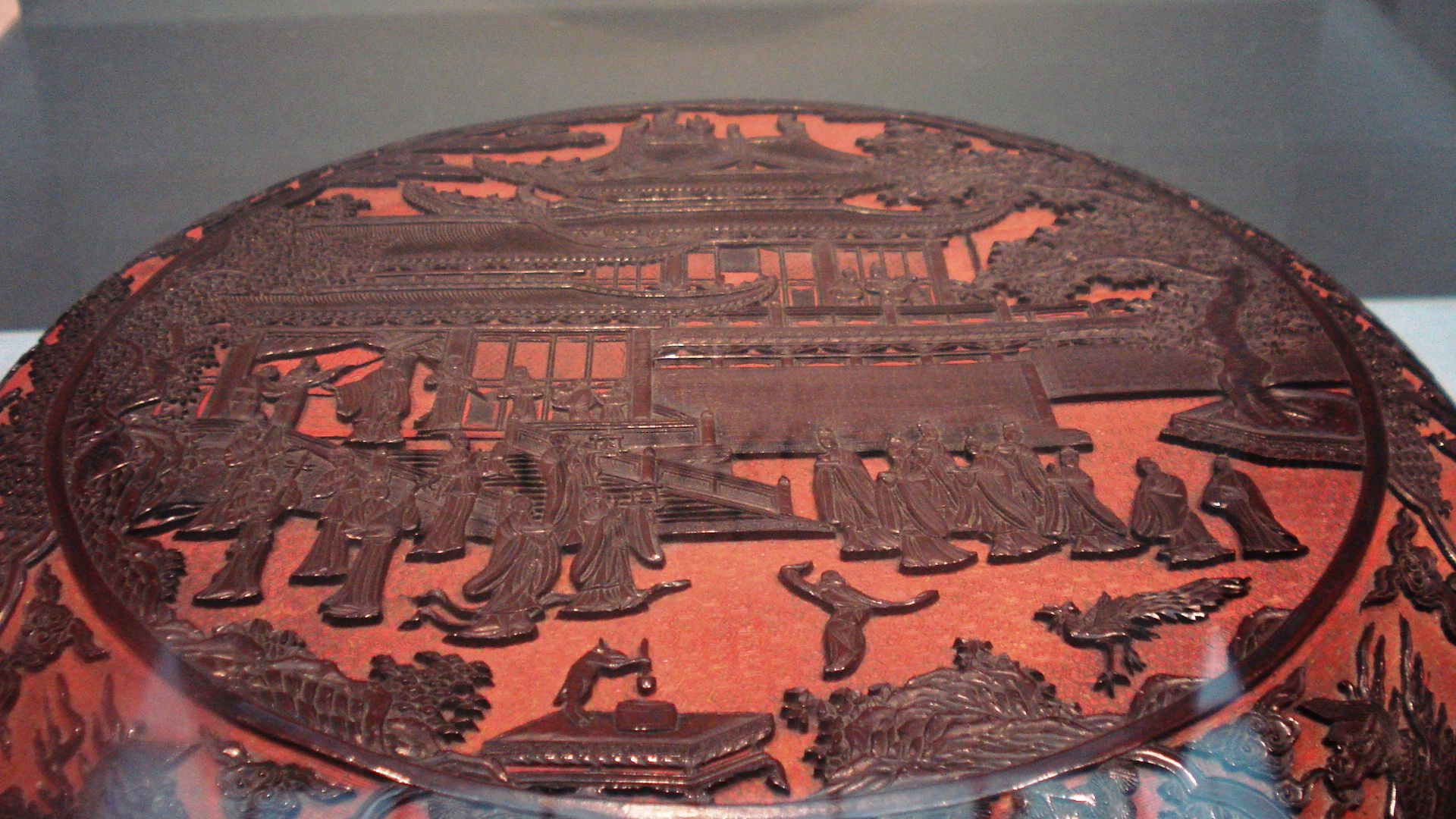
Moon Palace on Ming dynasty lacquer wooden box

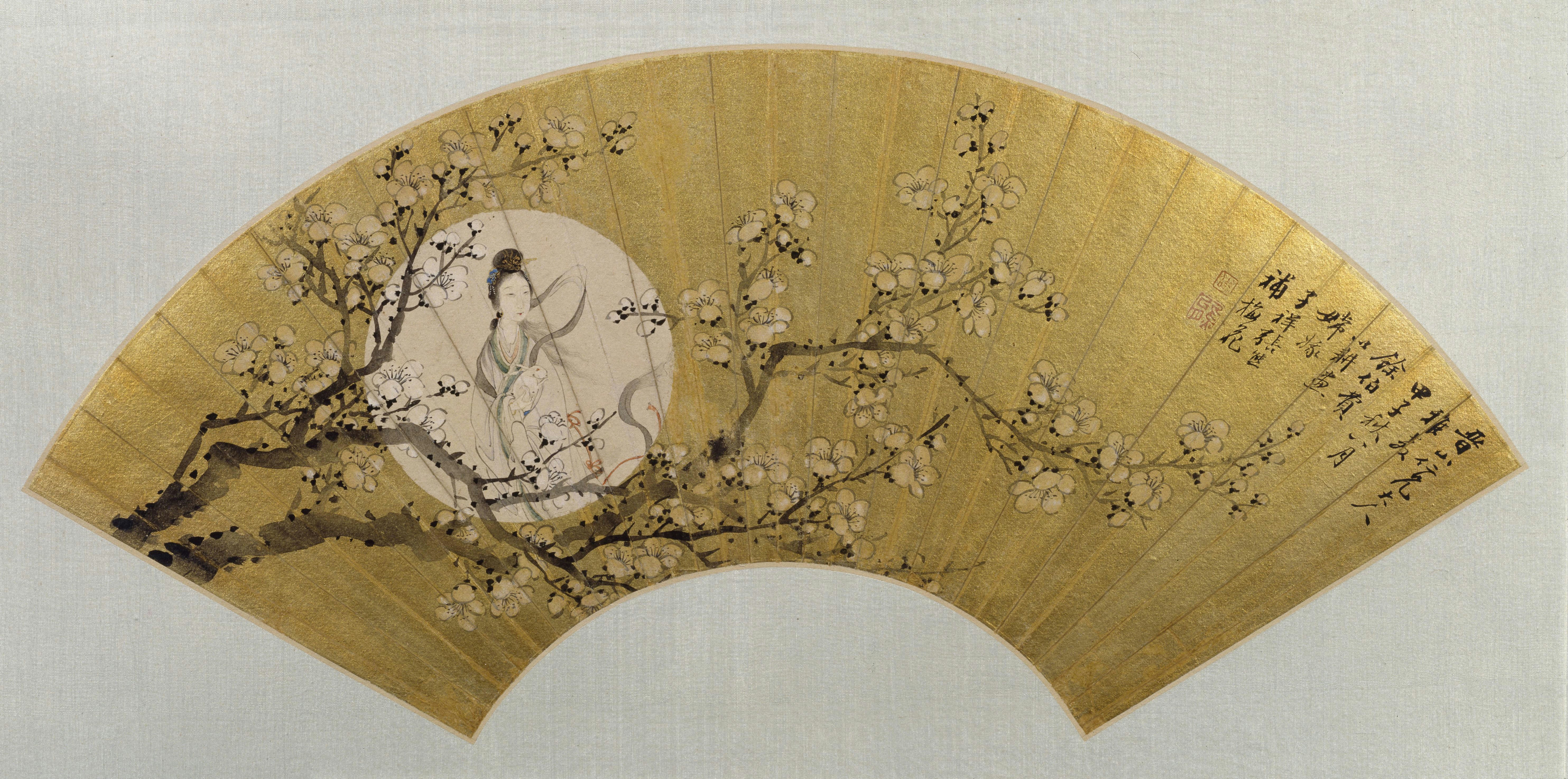
Fan map of Chang'e by Fei Yigeng and Zhang Xiong, from Qing dynasty

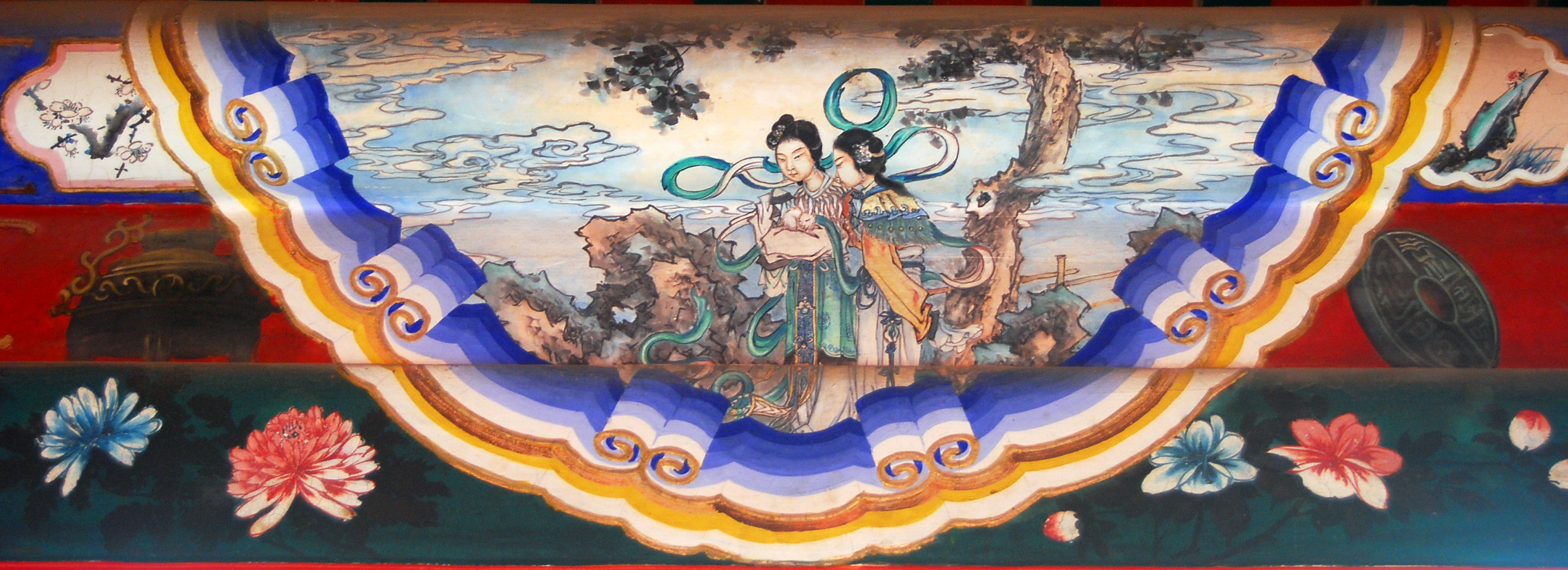
Colored Paintings of the Summer Palace Corridor: Guanghan Autumn Scenery, a copy of Qian Hui'an 's imitation of Qing dynasty painter Hua Yan in the late Qing dynasty

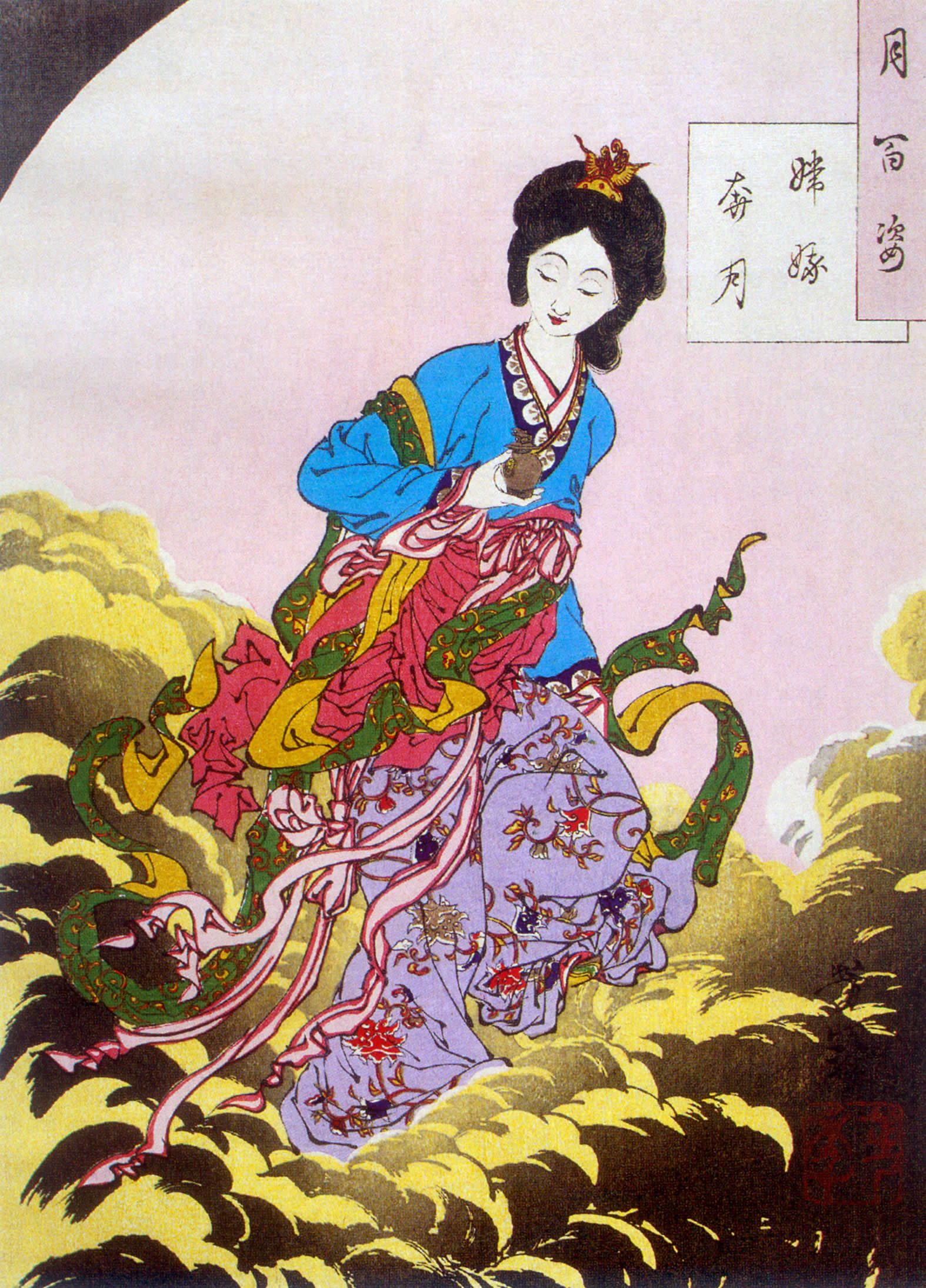
Tsukioka Yoshitoshi ukiyo-e A Hundred Poses of the Moon: Chang'e flees to the Moon

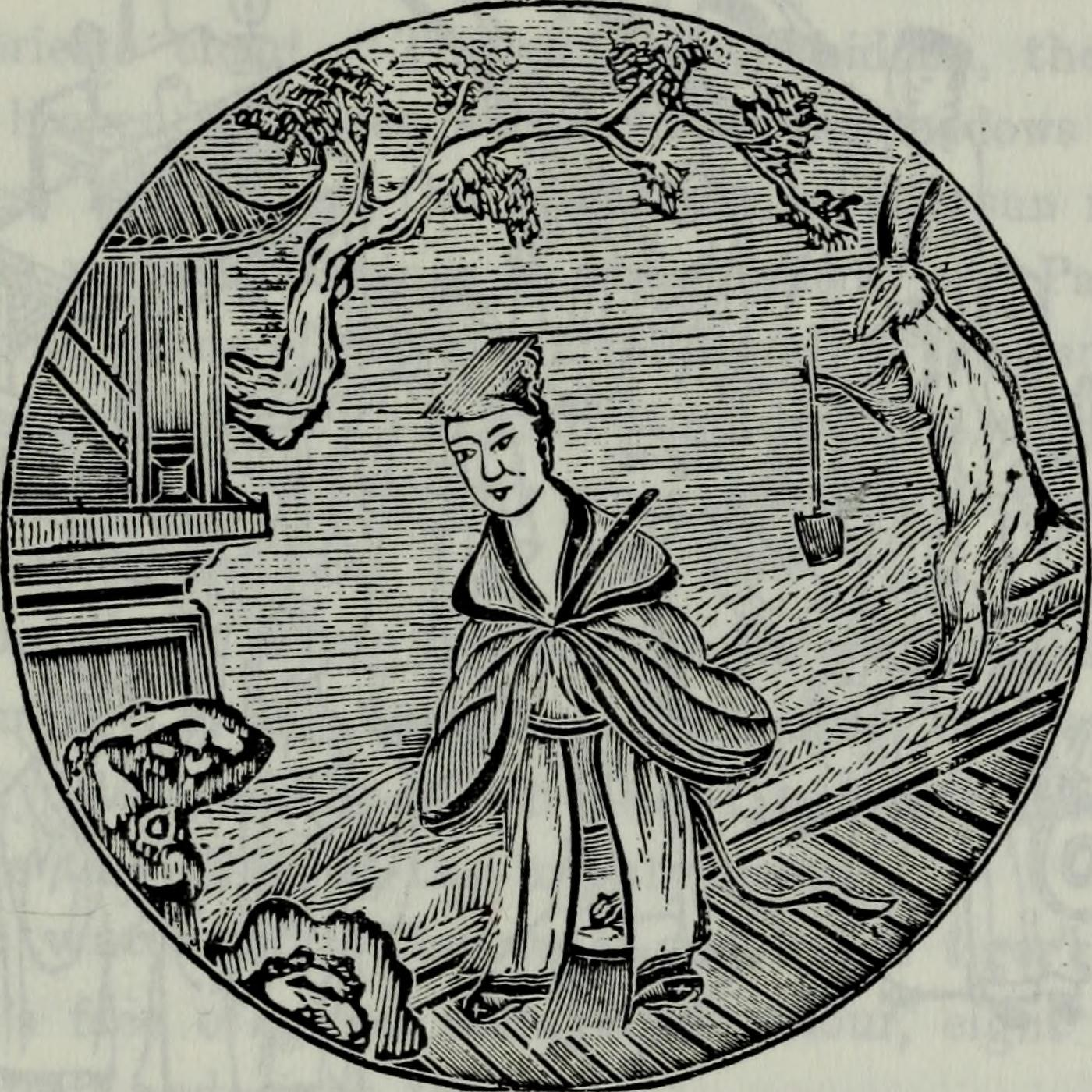
Illustration of Chang'e in Three Religions in China: Confucianism, Buddhism and Taoism (1887) of DuBose

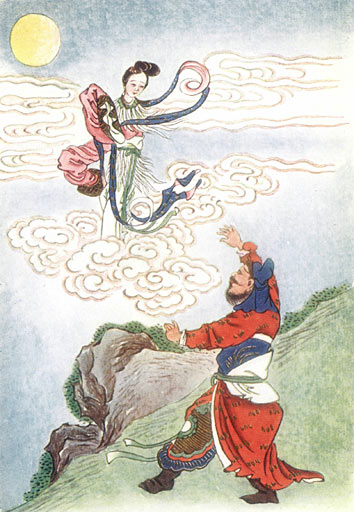
Chang'e flies off into the Moon as her husband Hou Yi watches

== See also ==
- List of lunar deities
- List of Chinese mythology

== Bibliography ==
- Yang, Lihui; An, Deming (2005). Handbook of Chinese mythology. Santa Barbara: ABC-Clio. ISBN 1-57607-806-X.
