= Anumati =

Anumati may refer to:

- Anumati (lunar phase), a phase of the moon
- Anumati (deity), in Hinduism
- Anumati (film), a 2013 Marathi film
