= List of lunar deities =

A lunar deity is a deity who represents the Moon, or an aspect of it. Lunar deities and Moon worship can be found throughout most of recorded history in various forms. The following is a list of lunar deities:

== Africa ==
Name	Image	Mythology / Religion	Details
Amesemi		Kushite	Protective goddess and wife of Apedemak, the lion-god. She was represented with a crown shaped as a falcon, or with a crescent moon on her head on top of which a falcon was standing.
Ayyur		Amazigh (Berber)	
Gleti		Dahomean	
Mawu		Dahomean	
Iah		Egyptian	Iah means "Moon".
iNyanga		Zulu	Goddess of the Moon.
Khonsu		Egyptian	The god of the moon. A story tells that Ra (the sun God) had forbidden Nut (the Sky goddess) to give birth on any of the 360 days of the calendar. In order to help her give birth to her children, Thoth (the god of wisdom) played against Khonsu in a game of senet. Khonsu lost to Thoth and then he gave away enough moonlight to create 5 additional days so Nut could give birth to her five children. It was said that before losing, the moonlight was on par with the sunlight. Sometimes, Khonsu is depicted as a hawk-headed god, however he is mostly depicted as a young man with a side-lock of hair, like a young Egyptian. He was also a god of time. The centre of his cult was at Thebes which was where he took place in a triad with Amun and Mut. Khonsu was also heavily associated Thoth who also took part in the measurement of time and the moon.
Nzambici		Bakongo	Goddess of Essence, as well as Goddess of Moon, Earth and Sky Mother.
Thoth		Egyptian	God of wisdom, the arts, science, and judgment.
Yemọja		Yoruba	Goddess of Creation, Water, Moon, the Motherhood, and Protection.

== Americas ==
=== Aztec mythology ===
- Metztli, Deity of the moon and farmers
- Coyolxauhqui, a Goddess.
- Tecciztecatl, a God.

=== Cahuilla mythology ===
- Menily, a Goddess.

=== Haitian Vodou ===
- Kalfu, a God.

=== Hopi mythology ===
- Muuya, a God.

=== Incan mythology ===
- Mama Killa, a Goddess.
- Ka-Ata-Killa, a Goddess.
- Coniraya, a God.

=== Inuit mythology ===
- Alignak , a God.
- Igaluk, sister of Alignak (technically the sun).
- Tarqiup Inua, a God.

=== Lakota mythology ===
- Hanwi, a Goddess.

=== Maya mythology ===
- Goddess Awilix; Xbalanque was their mortal (male) incarnation.
- Maya moon goddess.

=== Muisca religion ===
- Huitaca, a Goddess.
- Chía, a Goddess.

=== Nivaclé Mythology ===
- Jive'cla

=== Pawnee mythology ===
- Pah, a God.

=== Tupi Guarani mythology ===
- Abaangui, a God.
- Arasy, a Goddess.
- Jaci, a God/Goddess, whose gender depends on the tribe.

== East Asia ==
=== Ainu religion ===
- Kunnechup Kamui, a God.

=== Chinese mythology ===
- Jie Lin, a God that carries the Moon across the night sky.
- Changxi, the mother of twelve moons corresponding to the twelve months of the year.
- Chang'e, an immortal who lives on the Moon.
- Taiyin Xingjun (太陰星君; Tàiyīn xīng jūn) or Queen Jiang(Jiuhou Nü) of Investiture of the Gods in taoism and Chinese folk religion.
- Tu'er Ye, a rabbit God who lives on the Moon.
- Wu Gang, an immortal who lives on the Moon.

=== Indonesian mythology ===
- Dewi Ratih, a Goddess.
- Silewe Nazarata, a Goddess.

=== Japanese mythology ===
- Tsukuyomi-no-Mikoto, a God.

=== Korean mythology ===
- Myeongwol, a Goddess.

=== Vietnamese mythology ===
- Thần Mặt Trăng, the embodiment of the moon, the daughter of Ông Trời.
- Hằng Nga, a Goddess who lives on the moon.

== Philippines ==
=== Philippine mythology ===
- Kabigat (Bontok mythology): the goddess of the moon who cut off the head of Chal-chal's son; her action is the origin of headhunting.
- Bulan (Ifugao mythology): the moon deity of the night in charge of nighttime.
- Moon Deity (Ibaloi mythology): the deity who teased Kabunian for not yet having a spouse.
- Delan (Bugkalot mythology): deity of the moon, worshiped with the sun and stars; congenial with Elag; during quarrels, Elag sometimes covers Delan's face, causing the different phases of the moon; giver of light and growth.
- Bulan (Ilocano mythology): the moon god of peace who comforted the grieving Abra.
- Bulan (Pangasinense mythology): the merry and mischievous moon god, whose dim palace was the source of the perpetual light which became the stars; guides the ways of thieves.
- Wife of Mangetchay (Kapampangan mythology): wife of Mangetchay who gave birth to their daughter whose beauty sparked the great war; lives in the Moon.
- Mayari (Kapampangan mythology): the moon goddess who battled her brother, Apolaqui.
- Apûng Malyari (Kapampangan mythology): moon god who lives in Mount Pinatubo and ruler of the eight rivers.
- Mayari (Tagalog mythology): goddess of the moon; sometimes identified as having one eye; ruler of the world during nighttime and daughter of Bathala.
- Dalagang nasa Buwan (Tagalog mythology): the maiden of the moon.
- Dalagang Binubukot (Tagalog mythology): the cloistered maiden in the moon.
- Unnamed Moon God (Tagalog mythology): the night watchman who tattled on Rajo's theft, leading to an eclipse.
- Bulan-hari (Tagalog mythology): one of the deities sent by Bathala to aid the people of Pinak; can command rain to fall; married to Bitu-in.
- Bulan (Bicolano mythology): son of Dagat and Paros; joined Daga's rebellion; his body became the Moon; in another myth, he was alive and from his cut arm, the earth was established, and from his tears, the rivers and seas were established.
- Haliya (Bicolano mythology): the goddess of the moon, often depicted with a golden mask on her face.
- Libulan (Bisaya mythology): the copper-bodied son of Lidagat and Lihangin; killed by Kaptan's rage during the great revolt; his body became the moon.
- Bulan (Bisaya mythology): the moon deity who gives light to sinners and guides them in the night.
- Launsina (Capiznon mythology): the goddess of the Sun, Moon, stars, and seas, and the most beloved because people seek forgiveness from her.
- Diwata na Magbabaya (Bukidnon mythology): simply referred as Magbabaya; the good supreme deity and supreme planner who looks like a man; created the Earth and the first eight elements, namely bronze, gold, coins, rock, clouds, rain, iron, and water; using the elements, he also created the sea, sky, Moon, and stars; also known as the pure god who wills all things; one of three deities living in the realm called Banting.
- Bulon La Mogoaw (T'boli mythology): one of the two supreme deities; married to Kadaw La Sambad; lives in the seventh layer of the universe.
- Moon Deity (Maranao mythology): divine being depicted in an anthropomorphic form as a beautiful young woman; angels serve as her charioteers.

== Europe ==
Name	Image	Mythology / Religion	Details
Arianrhod		Welsh	
Artemis		Greek	Artemis is the ancient Greek goddess of the hunt, wilderness, wild animals, chastity, and occasionally the Moon due to being mistaken for Selene. She is the daughter of Zeus and Leto and the twin sister of Apollo. She would eventually be extensively syncretized with the Roman goddess Diana. Cynthia was originally an epithet of the Greek goddess Artemis, who according to legend was born on Mount Cynthus. Selene, the Greek personification of the Moon, and the Roman Diana were also sometimes called "Cynthia".
Artume		Etruscan	
Ataegina		Lusitanian	
Sin		Ancient Mesopotamian religion	
Bendis		Thracian	
Devana		Slavic	Devana was the Slavic goddess of wild nature, forests, hunting and the moon, equated with the Greek goddess Artemis and Roman goddess Diana.
Diana		Roman	Diana is a goddess in Roman and Hellenistic religion, primarily considered a patroness of the countryside, hunters, crossroads, and the Moon. She is equated with the Greek goddess Artemis (see above), and absorbed much of Artemis' and Selenes mythology early in Roman history, including a birth on the island of Delos to parents Jupiter and Latona, and a twin brother, Apollo, though she had an independent origin in Italy.
Elatha		Irish	Elatha was a king of the Fomorians in Irish mythology. He succeeded his father Delbáeth and was replaced by his son Bres, mothered by Ériu.
Hecate		Greek	While associated with the Moon, Hecate is not actually considered a goddess of the moon.
Hëna		Albanian	Hëna ("the Moon) is a personified female deity in Albanian mythology.
Khors		Slavic	
Hjúki and Bil		Norse	
Ilargi		Basque	
Kuutar		Finnish	
Losna		Etruscan	
Luna		Roman	Roman counterpart to the Greek Titaness Selene. Sibling to Sol and Aurora. Considered one of the 20 principal deities of Rome, having had temples on both the Aventine and Palatine hills.
Mano		Sámi	
Máni		Norse	Máni is the personification of the Moon in Norse mythology. Máni, personified, is attested in the Poetic Edda, compiled in the 13th century from earlier traditional sources, and the Prose Edda, written in the 13th century by Snorri Sturluson. Both sources state that he is the brother of the personified sun, Sól, and the son of Mundilfari, while the Prose Edda adds that he is followed by the children Hjúki and Bil through the heavens.
Meh₁not		Proto-Indo-European mythology	
Meness		Latvian	
Myesyats		Slavic	
Phoebe		Greek	
Selene		Greek	Selene is a Titan goddess and personification of the moon. She was depicted as a woman riding sidesaddle on a horse or driving a chariot drawn by a pair of winged steeds.
Tõlze		Mari	God of the Moon for Volga Finnic peoples.
Triple Goddess		Wicca	

== Oceania ==
=== Malagasy mythology ===
- Andriamahilala, a Goddess.

=== Polynesian mythology ===
- Avatea, a God.
- Fati, a God.
- Hina, a Goddess.
- Mahina, a Goddess.
- Marama, a God.

=== Australian Aboriginal mythology ===
- Bahloo, a God.

=== Mandjindja mythology ===
- Kidili, a God.

=== Yolŋu mythology ===
- Ngalindi, a God.

== Western Asia ==
=== Anatolian ===
- Arma (Luwian religion), a God.
- Kašku (Hittite mythology), a God.
- Men (Phrygian mythology), a God.

=== Elamite ===
- Napir, a God.

=== Hinduism ===
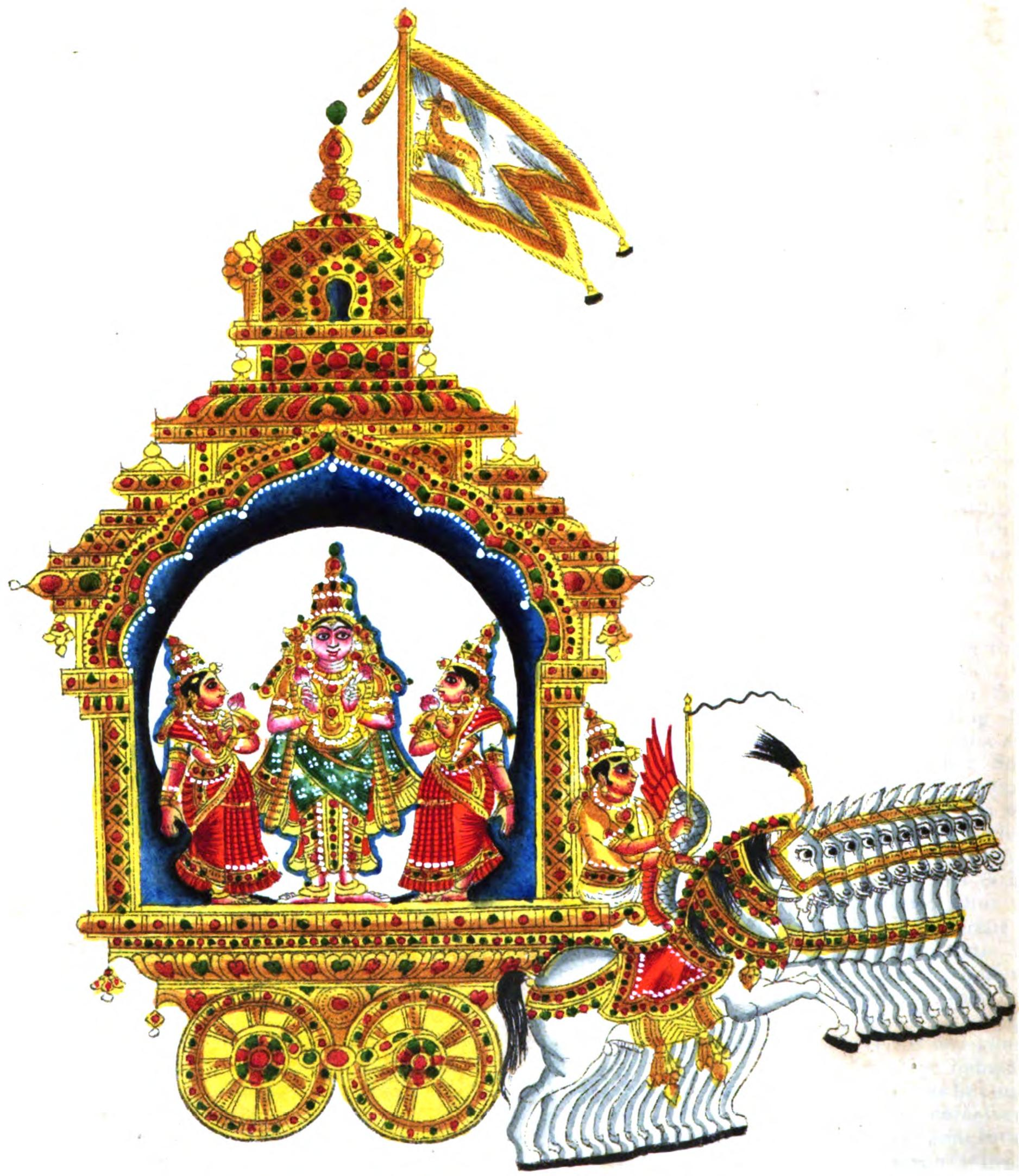
The Hindu moon god Chandra, riding his celestial chariot

- God Agni, invoked as a male Moon deity in some hymns
- Chandra or Soma, the Moon God.
- Anumati, the Moon Goddess.

=== Hurro-Urartian ===
- Kušuḫ (Hurrian religion), god of the moon.
- Selardi (Urartian religion), a Goddess.

=== Semitic mythology ===
- Aglibol (Palmarene mythology), a God.
- Almaqah (Sabaean mythology), a God.
- Baal Hammon (Punic religion), a God.
- Saggar (Eblaite religion), a God.
- Sin (Mesopotamian mythology), a God.
- Ta'lab (Arabian mythology), a God.
- Wadd (Minaean mythology), a God.
- Yarikh (Amorite and Ugaritic mythology), a God.

=== Turkic mythology ===
- Ay Ata, a God.

=== Zoroastrianism ===
- Mah, a God.

== See also ==
- Allah as a lunar deity
- List of solar deities
- Man in the Moon
- Moon idol, a type of firedog
- Moon rabbit
- Nature worship
- Sky deity
- Solar deity
- Worship of heavenly bodies

== Bibliography ==
- Neils, Jennifer; Oakley, John H. (August 11, 2003). Coming of Age in Ancient Greece: Images of Childhood from the Classical Past. Hanover, New Hampshire, United States: Hood Museum of Art. ISBN 978-0300099591.
- Rees, Alwyn; Rees, Brinley (1961). Celtic Heritage: Ancient Tradition in Ireland and Wales. High Holborn, London, England: Thames & Hudson.
- Sacks, David (January 1, 1995). Murray, Oswyn (ed.). A Dictionary of the Ancient Greek World. Oxford, England, United Kingdom: Oxford University Press. ISBN 978-0195112061.
- Shen, Ann (April 3, 2018). Legendary Ladies: 50 Goddesses to Empower and Inspire You. San Francisco, United States: Chronicle Books. ISBN 978-1452163413.
- Harley, Timothy. Moon Lore. London: S. Sonnenschein [etc.], 1885. pp. 77–139.
