= Watazumi Shrine =

Shinto shrine in Tsushima, Nagasaki

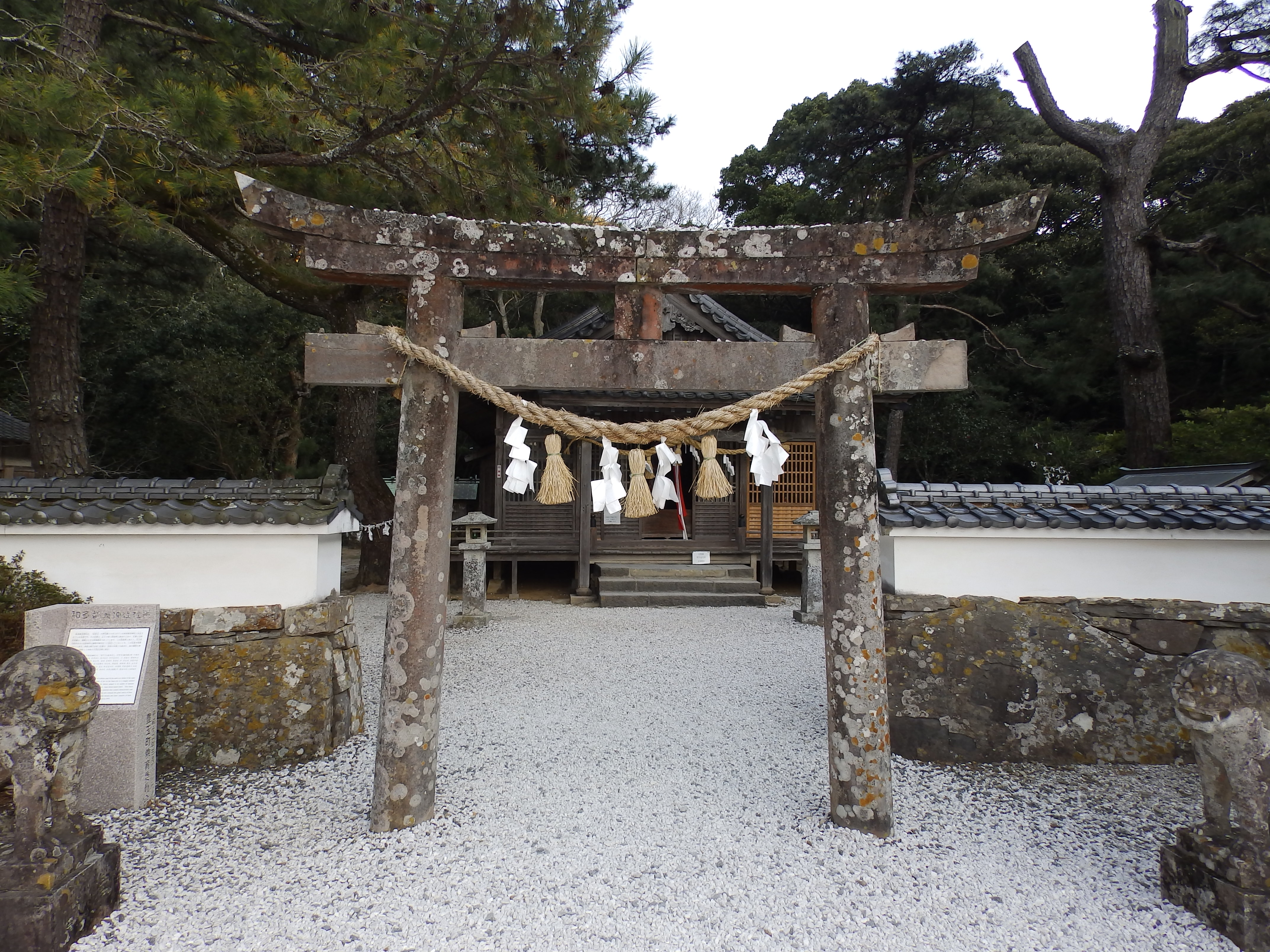

Religion
- Affiliation: Shinto
- Deity: Hikohohodemi no Mikoto and Toyotamabime

Location
- Interactive map of Watazumi Shrine
- Coordinates: 34°22′45.5″N 129°18′42.7″E

Watazumi Shrine, also known as Watatsumi Shrine, is a Shinto shrine in Tsushima, Nagasaki.

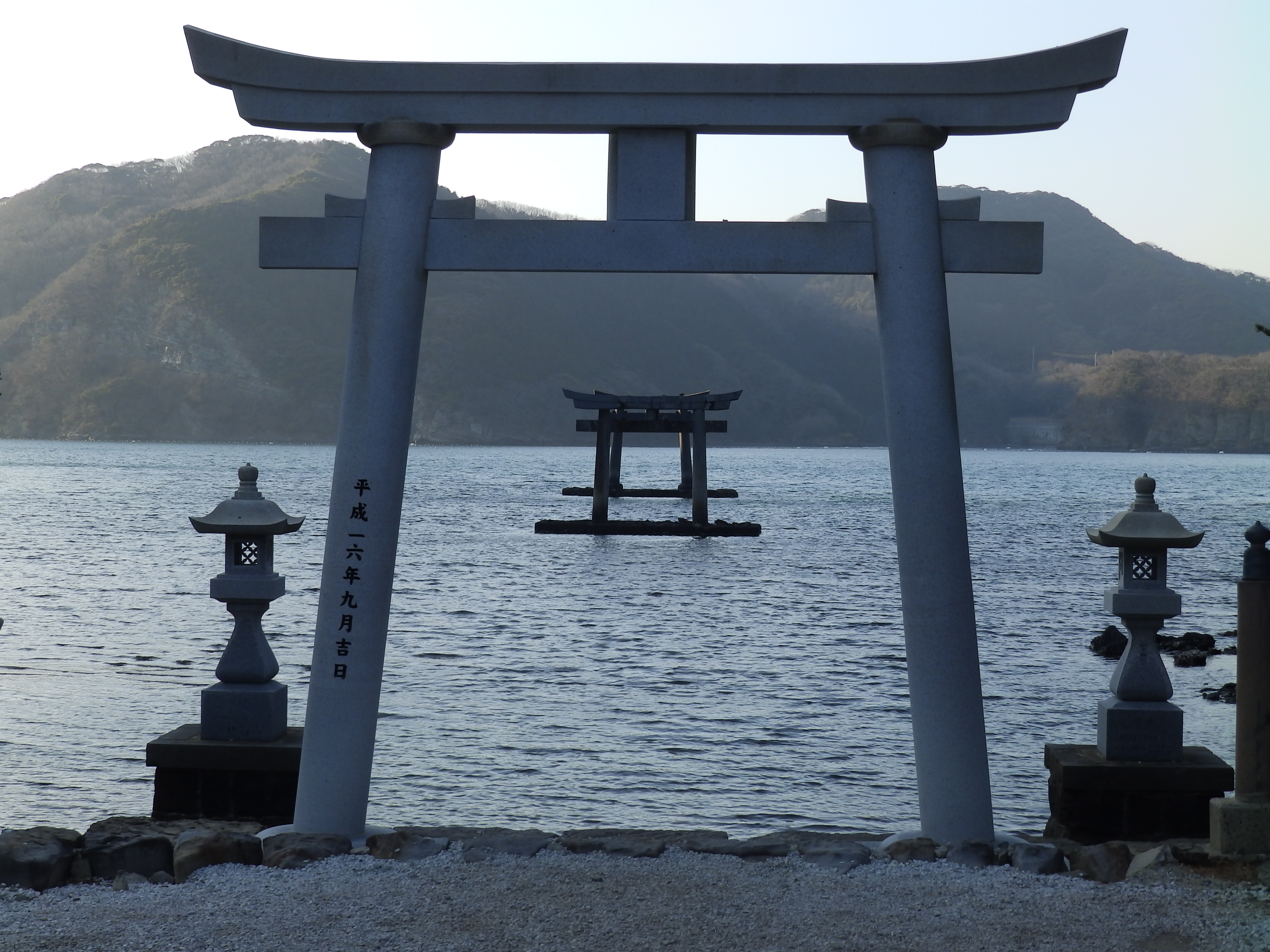
Torii facing the sea

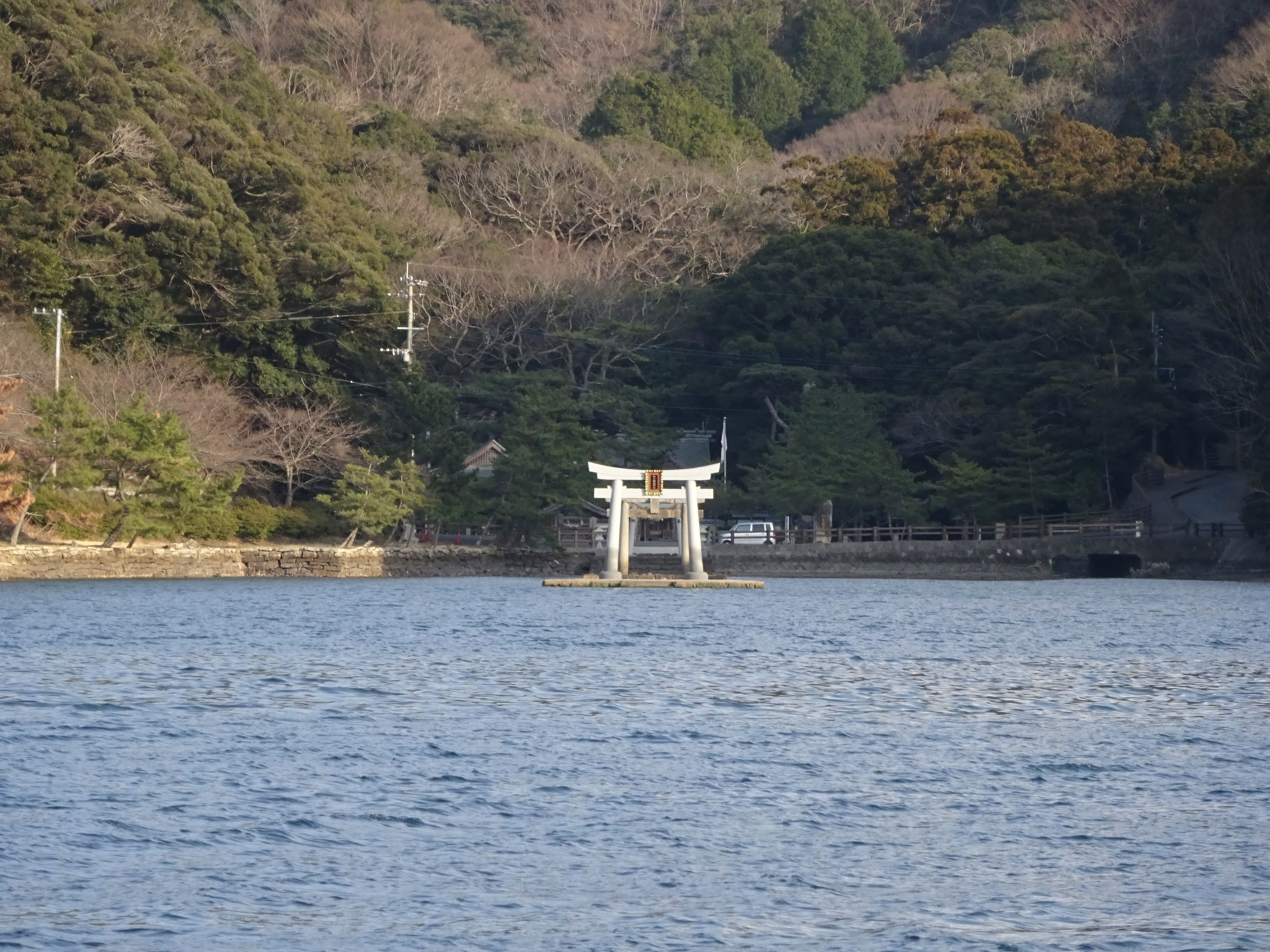
Torii seen from the sea side

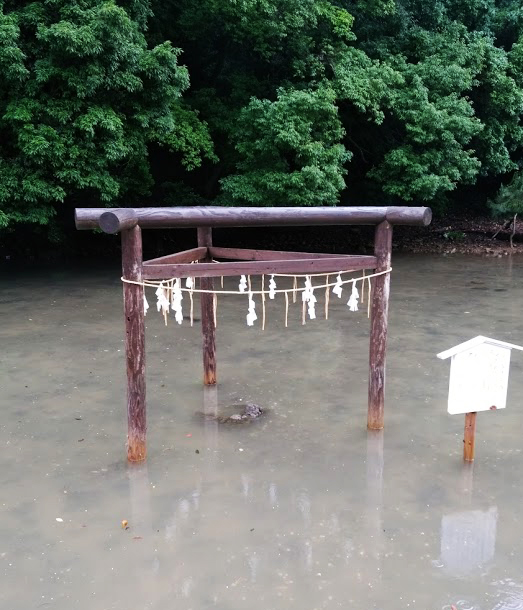
Three pillar torii in the pond

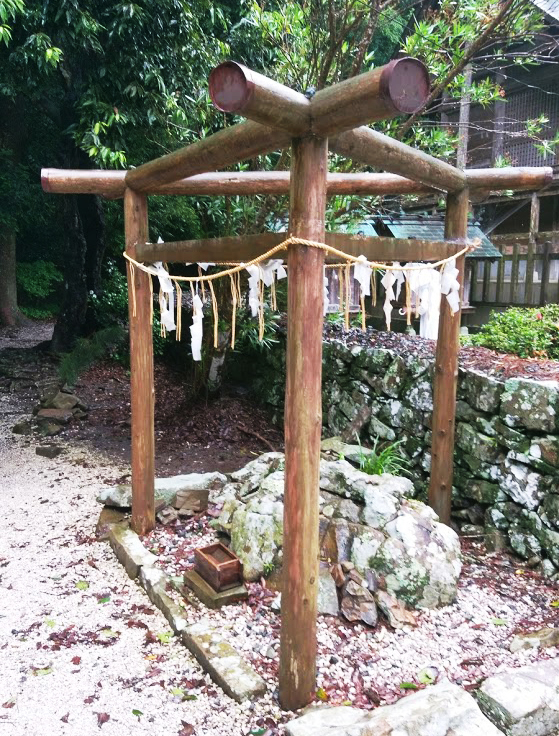
Three-pillar torii gate next to the shrine

== Description ==
It has a famous row of five torii in a row with two in the ocean similar to Itsukushima Shrine.

A typhoon damaged the Torii gate at Watatsumi Shrine in Tsushima, Japan. This happened in September 2020. A crowdfunding campaign started on November 27, 2020 on the Japanese website Camp-Fire. It aimed to repair the gate. The campaign reached its initial goal quickly. This goal was 5 million yen. It was reached by December 1, 2020. The campaign raised a total of 27,103,882 yen ($260,435). Many donors were fans of the "Ghost of Tsushima" game. The restoration was planned to start in April 2021, and to finish by August 2021. There were plans for a stone monument. It would list the names of those who donated at least 10,000 yen. Concerns were raised over coronavirus affecting the construction.

In January 2020, the shrine's operators banned foreigners from visiting due to behavioral issues that they attributed primarily to South Korean guests. The shrine's operators alleged that people held picnics at the shrine, a YouTuber filmed there without permission, tour guides disrespected sacred areas, and some tourists put graffiti at the shrine. Some amulets were alleged to be stolen. A Korean tour guide reportedly threatened the priest's life. This ban substantially reduced the amount of Korean tourists who visited Tsushima. Some have described the ban, especially as it singled out the Korean tourists, as discriminatory.

== In popular culture ==
In the game "Ghost of Tsushima," there is a similar shrine. It is the Scarlet Rock Shrine. The real shrine is dedicated to two deities, Hikohohodemi no Mikoto and Toyotamabime. The game's shrine is dedicated to Tsukuyomi.

== See also ==
- Kaijin Shrine
- Mihashira Torii
