= Watatsumi Shrine =

Watatsumi Shrine can refer to the following

- Watatsumi Shrine
- Watazumi Shrine sometimes read as Watatsumi Shrine
- Kaijin Shrine sometimes read as Watatsumi Shrine
- Another shrine to Watatsumi
