= Abaangui =

Moon god of the Guaraní people

Abaangui is the moon god in the mythology of the Guaraní people of central South America.

According to the myth, Abaangui had a huge nose, which he cut off. When he threw it into the sky, it became the Moon.

He is described as being a culture hero of the Guaraní, with his brother Zaguaguayu.

== See also ==
- Guaraní mythology
- List of lunar deities
