= Ka-Ata-Killa =

Pre-Inca Moon goddess

In the pre-Inca mythology of the Lake Titicaca Ka-Ata-Killa is the moon goddess.

== See also ==
- List of lunar deities
