= Viðfinnr =

Norse mythical character

In Norse mythology, Viðfinnr ("wood-Finn") is the father of Hjúki and Bil, a brother and sister who, according to Gylfaginning, were taken up from the earth by Máni, the personified moon, as they were fetching water from the well Byrgir.
