= Losna =

Losna may refer to:

== Places ==
- Losna (island), an island in Solund municipality in Vestland county, Norway
- Losna (lake), a lake in the municipalities of Ringebu and Øyer in Innlandet county, Norway
- Loşna River, a headwater of the Negoiu river in Romania
- Losna, Russia, a village in Smolensk, Russia

== Other ==
- Losna (mythology), the Etruscan moon goddess

== See also ==
- Losne, a commune in the Côte-d'Or department in eastern France
