= Gleti =

Moon goddess in Benin

Gleti is a moon goddess of the Fon people from the Kingdom of Dahomey, situated in what is now Benin.

In Dahomey mythology, she is the mother of all the stars. An eclipse is caused by the shadow of the moon's husband crossing her face.

== See also ==
- List of lunar deities
- Nix (moon)
