= Feldgeister =

Agricultural spirits in German folklore

Feldgeister ('field spirits'; German: [ˈfɛltˌɡaɪ̯stɐ]; singular: Feldgeist) or Korndämonen ('corn demons'; German: [ˈkɔʁnˌdɛˈmoːnən]; singular: Korndämon) are corn spirits in German folklore. Feldgeister are often also wind spirits, causing lightning and rain.

Numerous Feldgeister are known in German folklore, some shaped as animals, some in human form. The last grain heads and tree fruits are often left at their place as a sacrifice for the agricultural spirits. During harvest season Feldgeister flee deeper into the fields to escape the mowers. With the last cornstalks the corn spirit becomes trapped. Either it is killed by cutting the grain heads, threshing the corn or it is brought to the village in a ceremonial manner, shaped as a corn doll. Direct contact to the Feldgeist causes illness.

== Animal Feldgeister ==
=== Carnivores ===
==== Roggenwolf ====
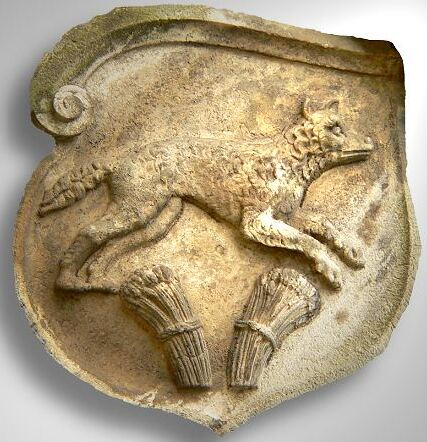
A Roggenwolf, a carnivorous spirit of the rye fields, with sheaves of harvested rye, on the coat of arms of the Bartensleben family

The Roggenwolf ("rye wolf"), Getreidewolf ("grain wolf") or Kornwolf ("corn wolf") is a field spirit shaped as a wolf. The Roggenwolf steals children and feeds on them.

Other names are Gerstenwolf ("barley wolf"), Haferwolf ("oat wolf"), Erbsenwolf ("pea wolf"), Kartoffelwolf ("potato wolf"), Graswolf ("grass wolf") and Pflaumenwolf ("plum wolf").

Sometimes the Roggenwolf is equated with the werewolf.

==== Erbsenbär ====
The Erbsenbär ("pea bear") or Roggenbär ("rye bear") is a field spirit shaped as a bear.

==== Kornhund ====
The Kornhund ("corn dog") is a dog-shaped wind spirit feeding on flour.

Other names are Roggenhund ("rye dog"), Heupudel ("hay poodle"), Schotenhund ("husk dog"), Scheunbetze ("barn dog"), Dreschhund ("threshing dog"), Weizenbeller ("wheat barker") or Kornmops ("corn pug")

The Kiddelhunde ("titillation dogs") look for children to tickle them to death.

==== Kornkatze and Kornkater ====
There are several cat-shaped field spirits. The Kornkatze ("corn cat"), Wetterkatze ("weather cat"), Heukatze ("hay cat") or Windkatze ("wind cat") is a female cat spirit.

The male equivalent of the Kornkatze is the Kornkater ("corn tomcat") Murrkater ("grumbling tomcat") or Bullkater ("bull tomcat") who steals children looking for cornflowers.

=== Hoofed animals ===
==== Scheunesel ====
The Scheunesel (barn donkey) or Baumesel ("tree donkey") is a corn spirit shaped as a donkey.

==== Roggensau and Korneber ====
There are also pig corn demons. One such pig is the Roggensau ("rye sow"). The Roggensau steals human children or perches itself on a hiker's back. Other names are Windsau ("wind sow"), Kleesau ("clover sow"), Kornsau ("corn sow"), Aumsau ("chaff sow") or îserne Range ("iron sow").

The Korneber ("corn boar") is a male pig-shaped field spirit.

==== Kornstier, Märzenkalb and Kornkuh ====
The Kornstier ("corn bull") is a cattle-shaped corn spirit. At Christmas the bull fertilizes the fruit tree. In spring the Kornstier is called Aprilochse ("April ox") or Maiochse ("May ox").

Another cattle-shaped spirit present in the fields in springtime is the Märzenkalb or Märzkalb (both "march calf").

Additionally, a cow is also present called the Kornkuh or Kornmockel ("both corn cow")

==== Haferbock and Habergeiß ====
The Haferbock ("oat buck") or Erntebock ("harvest buck") is a he-goat spirit. This Feldgeist is also known as Austbock ("harvest buck"), Halmbock ("haulm buck"), Erbsenbock ("pea buck"), Kornbock ("corn buck"), Roggenbock ("rye buck"), Arftenbuck ("pea buck"), Bohnenbock ("bean buck"), Nickelbock Haberbock ("oat buck"), Grasbock ("grass buck"), Heubock ("hay buck") or Baumbock ("tree buck"). At Christmas the buck fertilizes the fruit tree.

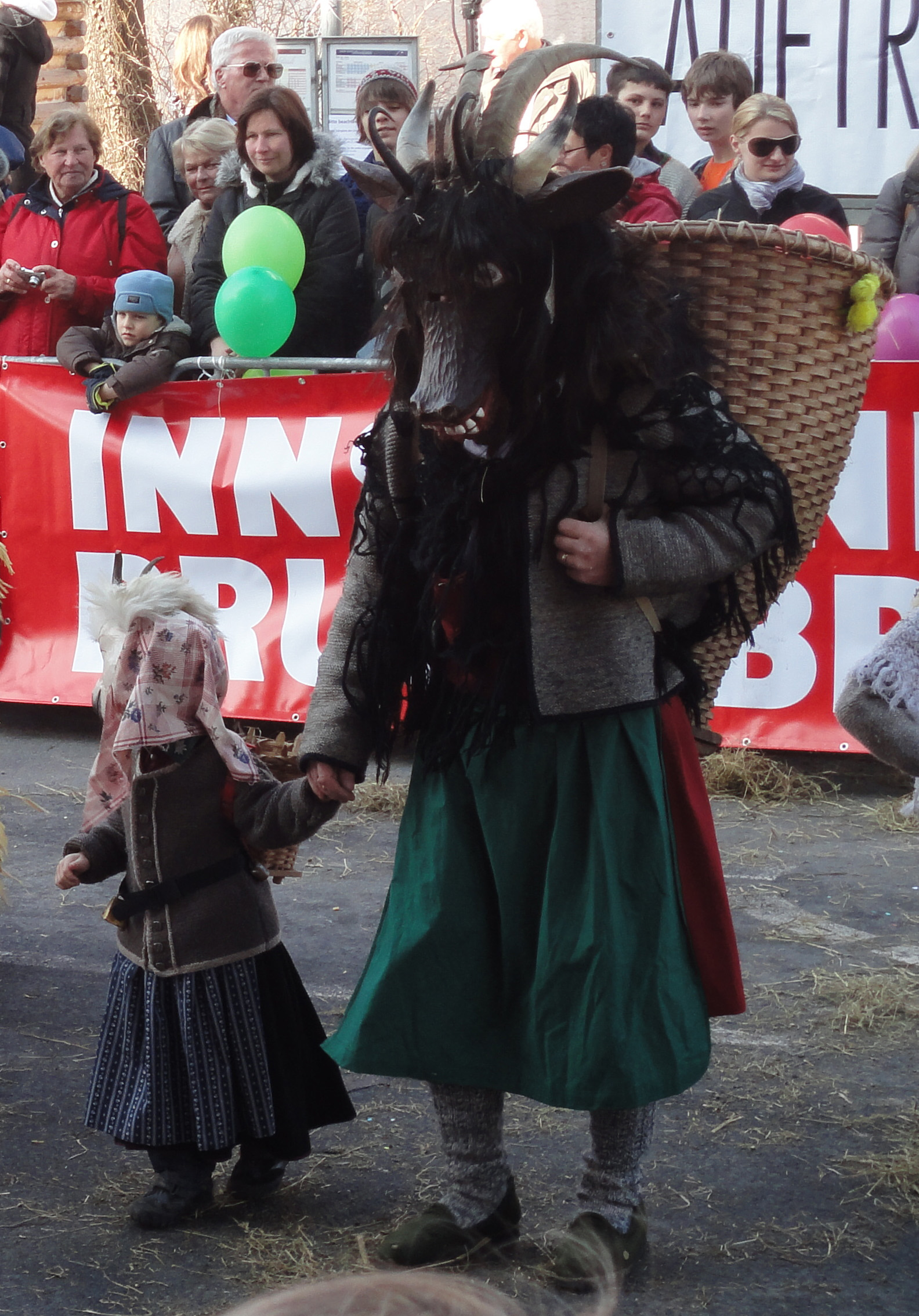
People dressed as oat spirits or Habergeißen at a carnival parade in Innsbruck, Austria

The female equivalent of the Haferbock is the Habergeiß ("oat goat"), also known as Korngeiß ("corn goat"), Weizengeiß ("wheat goat") Roggengeiß ("rye goat"), Hobagoaß ("oat goat") or Heugeiß ("hay goat"). The Habergeiß is sometimes said to have only three legs. It is sometimes also described as a three-footed bird, as a yellow bird with goat voice, as half a goat and half a bird, as a goat with horse feet and a mouth like a half-opened scutcher or as a young chamois with wings. The cry of the Habergeiß pronounces springtime as well as bad luck. Someone who imitates the cry of the Habergeiß will get punishment. The Habergeiß hunts, scratches or even eats the meddlesome one. If not, it will hang itself as a bloody coat at the crier's door. This corn demon also slaps people looking out of the window at night or takes part in the wild hunt, is also the mount of the devil. In heavy thunderstorm the Habergeiß bring cut grain from one field to another foreign field. The appearance of the Habergeiß causes bad luck. The corn will spoil, the cows will lose weight, give no milk and felt. When the cry of the Habergeiß is heard in autumn this means a long winter and lack of hay.

Both Haferbock and Habergeiß steal, hit or kill children.

=== Birds ===
==== Weizenvogel ====
A corn spirit shaped as a bird is the Weizenvogel ("wheat bird") or Rätschvogel.

==== Getreidehahn and Erntehenne ====
The Getreidehahn or Troadhân (both "grain rooster") is a rooster-shaped corn demon who sits in corn field and waits for children to peck out their eyes. Other names are Arnhahn, Erntehahn, Bauthahn (all "harvest rooster"), Herbsthahn ("autumn rooster") Schnitthahn ("cut rooster"), Stoppelhahn ("stubble rooster"), Kornhahn ("corn rooster") or Saathahn ("seed rooster").

The female equivalent of the Getreidehahn is the Erntehenne or Aarhenne (both "harvest hen").

=== Others ===
Other corn spirits are shaped as rabbits, deer, sheep, horses, foxes, mice, geese, storks, swans, dragons or toads.

== Therioanthropomorphic Feldgeister ==
Some Feldgeister show mixed animal and human features. One example is the Katzenmann ("cat man") who shares feline and human features. The Bockmann or Bockelmann (both "buck man") instead is a human-goat hybrid who steals children. He is also known as Bockkêrl ("buck guy") or Bockemâ ("buck man").

== Anthropomorphic Feldgeister ==
=== Roggenmuhme ===
The Roggenmuhme ("rye aunt"; German: [ˈʁɔɡn̩ˌmuːmə]) is a female corn demon with fiery fingers. Her bosoms are filled with tar, and may end in tips of igneous iron. Her bosoms are also long, and as such must be thrown over her shoulders when she runs. The Roggenmuhme is completely black or white, and in her hand she has a birch or whip from which lightning sparks. She can change herself into different animals; such as snakes, turtles, frogs and others.

The Roggenmuhme is well known for stealing human children which are looking for cornflowers. The Roggenmuhme is also known to replace children with changelings. She forces children to suck at her deadly bosom, and may strike the children with her bosom. The Roggenmuhme also chases children at speeds simultaneous to a running horse. She blows the eyelight of children out, and pounds children in her iron butter churn. The Roggenmuhme is said to be the mother of the Roggenwölfe ("rye wolves") and can, herself, also be in the form of a wolf. Sometimes the Roggenmuhme is accompanied by little dogs who lead children into her iron hug.

The Roggenmuhme walks through the corn field looking for food. She eats the grain, either all or just the very towering spikes. When the corn is bad or dried up, the Roggenmuhme punishes the farmer. A Roggenmuhme striding the fields is an indicator of a good harvest. The Roggenmuhme is also known to pester the maidservants who were not fully spinning their distaffs until Twelfth Night.

Other names for the Roggenmuhme are Roggenmutter ("rye mother"), Regenmöhme ("rain aunt"), Kornwyf ("corn woman"), Kornmutter ("corn mother"), Kornfrau ("corn lady"), Kornmuhme ("corn aunt"), Kornweib ("corn woman"), Roggenmöhme ("rye aunt"), Preinscheuhe, Tremsemutter ("cornflower mother"), Rockenmör ("distaff mother"), Kornengel ("corn angel"), Weizenmutter ("wheat mother"), Gerstenmutter ("barley mother"), Flachsmutter ("flax mother"), Erbsenmuhme ("pea aunt"), Großmutter ("grandmother") wilde Frau ("wild lady"), Weizenmuhme ("wheat aunt"), Gerstenmuhme ("barley aunt"), Tittewîf ("bosom woman"), Buttermuhme ("butter aunt"), Erntemutter ("harvest mother"), die Alte ("the old one"), Heimmutter ("home mother"), große Mutter ("big mother"), alte Hure ("old prostitute"), große Hure ("big prostitute"). and Haferfrau ("oat lady").

Kornmaid ("corn maiden"), Getreidemagd ("grain maidservant"), die Magd ("the maidservant"), Kornjungfer ("corn damsel"), Haferbraut ("oat bride"), die Braut ("the bride") and Weizenbraut ("wheat bride") are younger Roggenmuhmen.

=== Hafermann ===
The Hafermann ("oat man") is a male corn demon who steals children. He throws an iron shillelagh. Wearing a big black hat and having a giant stick in his hand, the Hafermann waits for passants to kidnap them through the air.

Other names for the Hafermann are Getreidemann ("grain man"), der Alte ("the old one"), Heidemann ("heath man"), Heidemänneken ("little heath man"), Kornjude ("corn Jew"), who is said to be Jewish according to historical anti-Semitic sentiment, Kornmann ("corn man"), der schwarze Mann ("the black man"), der wilde Mann ("the wild man"), Grummetkerl ("hay guy"), Getreidemännchen ("little grain man"), Kleemännchen ("little clover man"), Grasteufel ("grass devil"), Roggenmann ("rye man"), Weizenmann ("wheat man"), Gerstenmann ("barley man"), Erntemann ("harvest man"), Schewekerl, de grîse mann ("the grey man") or Erdäpfelmann ("potato man").

A creature of similar name if not identical is the Heidmann ("heath man"). This ghost looks at night through the windows of a house and the person he looks at must die in year and day.

Der böse Sämann ("the evil sower"), another male corn demon, can be cast out by going over the fields with burning wisps of straw at the first day of fasting period. It is said that the Säemann ("sower") is the owner of the Saathahn ("seed rooster"), a bird which is associated with seed. The Saathahn is to be gathered by going out on the fields with a bag full of green shrubbery.

The Haferbräutigam ("oat bridegroom") is a younger Hafermann.

=== Kornkind ===
The Kornkind ("corn child") or Ährenkind ("grain head child") is a corn spirit shaped as a child. It is identical with the fruit of the field which is "born" by harvest. Other names for the Kornkind are das Kind ("the child"), Erntekind ("harvest child"), Hôrputtel, Hôrkind and Hurenbalg (all "prostitute's child") and Reppekindchen.

=== Haferkönig and Haferkönigin ===
The Haferkönig ("oat king") and Haferkönigin ("oat queen") are the rulers of all field spirits. Other names are Kong ("king"), Lattichkönig ("lettuce king") and Maigraf ("may earl").

=== Bilwis ===
See also the North Germanic goddess Bil: Hjúki and Bil § Bilwis

The Bilwis is a male or female corn spirit of sometimes demonic or sometimes human origin. It has flying hair, is wrapped in white linen and wears a little triangular hat. The Bilwis rolls through the corn shaped as a destructive giant ball or appears as a whirlwind to steal grain during harvest season. Both can be repelled by throwing a knife with three crosses on its blade on the Bilwis, shouting: "Da hast du es, Bilbze!" ("There you have it, Bilwis!").

Sorcerers acting as Bilwis and helpful methods against them are described by Ludwig Bechstein:

"Even today, and this is popular belief, there are also such Bilsenschnitter (Bilwisse), that are people, going out to the fields very early at the days of Himmelfahrt (either Ascension of Jesus or Mary), Saint John's Eve or Trinity Sunday, barefooted, a little sickle-shaped knife bond to the big toe of the right foot. They step through the seed and cut a line with the knife through it. At the time of harvest and threshing the tenth part of the fruit of such a field must bestow on the Bilsenschnitter. However, the business is associated with great danger. Will the Bilsenschnitter be called by someone or will be shot over him with a shotgun, then he has to die in the same year. When he notices and addresses the arrival earlier, the fate of death comes upon the other. Most farmers try to save themselves against the damage threatening their fields in such a way by plowing and sowing the field from outside first, because in grain cultivated in such a way no Bilsenschnitter can break in. When threshing the grain which was cut, the Bilsenschnitter comes, giving good words, that something in the farmstead may be borrowed him, which must not happen. For revenge at the Bilsenschnitter, twigs of juniper are added during threshing of the tithed grain. Every beat with the flair then strikes the Bilsenschnitter until he comes running at the end and requests, for all in the world, threshing may be created in another manner." (Translated from the German text)

Additionally, Bilwisse can be punished by hanging some of the grain heads, which are cut by a Bilwis, into the chimney. The Bilwis will dry out as the grain heads will do, becoming a mummy alive, finally dying woefully. The Bilwisschnitt ("Bilwis cut") can also be done by riding on a billy goat, then called a Bocksschnitt ("buck cut").

A Bilwis also muddles hair and beard, causes illness and nightmares. Non-human Bilwisse live in mountains and trees.

Other names for the Bilwis are Bil-wiss, Bilbze, Bilbsenschnitter (Schnitter = mower), Bilsenschnitter, Binsenschnitter, Belwit, Belewitte, Pilwis, Pilbis, Bilverschnitter, Bilmes, Bilgenschneider (Schneider = cutter) and Bilwiss.

=== Windsbraut ===
The Windsbraut ("wind's bride") is an (originally female, but occasionally also male) spirit of the whirlwind.

Windsbräute steal the earnings of fieldwork. They can be disarmed by throwing a knife into the whirlwind. A Windsbraut is unable to remove the knife by her own power and therefore needs the help of the knife's owner.

A Windsbraut is not always a demon but also can be a sorcerer or sorceress.

Other names for Windsbraut are Windschbrauß, Windbrauss, Windsprauch, Windgelle, Windschbrach, Windgäsperl ("wind Kasperle") and Windgäspele ("wind Kasperle").

== Bibliography ==
- Ludwig Bechstein: Deutsches Sagenbuch. F. W. Hendel Verlag, Meersbusch, Leipzig 1930.
- Felix Dahn, Therese Dahn: Germanische Götter- und Heldensagen. Marix-Verlag, Wiesbaden 2010, ISBN 978-3-937715-39-1.
- Wolfgang Golther: Germanische Mythologie: Vollständige Ausgabe. Marix-Verlag, Wiesbaden 2011, ISBN 978-3-937715-38-4.
- Jacob Grimm: Deutsche Mythologie: Vollständige Ausgabe. Marix-Verlag, Wiesbaden 2014, ISBN 978-3-86539-143-8.
- Wilhelm Grimm, Jacob Grimm: Deutsche Sagen: Vollständige Ausgabe mit Illustrationen von Otto Ubbellohde. Nikol, Hamburg 2014, ISBN 978-3-86820-245-8.
- Otto Holzapfel: Lexikon der abendländischen Mythologie. Anaconda, Cologne 2000, ISBN 978-3451055003.
- Edmund Mudrak: Das große Buch der Sagen. Ensslin, Würzburg 2007, ISBN 978-3-401-45307-1.
- Wilhelm Mannhardt: Die Korndämonen: Beitrag zur germanischen Sittenkunde. Bremen University Press, Bremen 2014, ISBN 978-3-95562-798-0.
- Wilhelm Mannhardt: Wald- und Feldkulte: Band II. Elibron Classics, 2005, ISBN 1-4212-4778-X.
