= Losna (mythology) =

Etruscan moon goddess

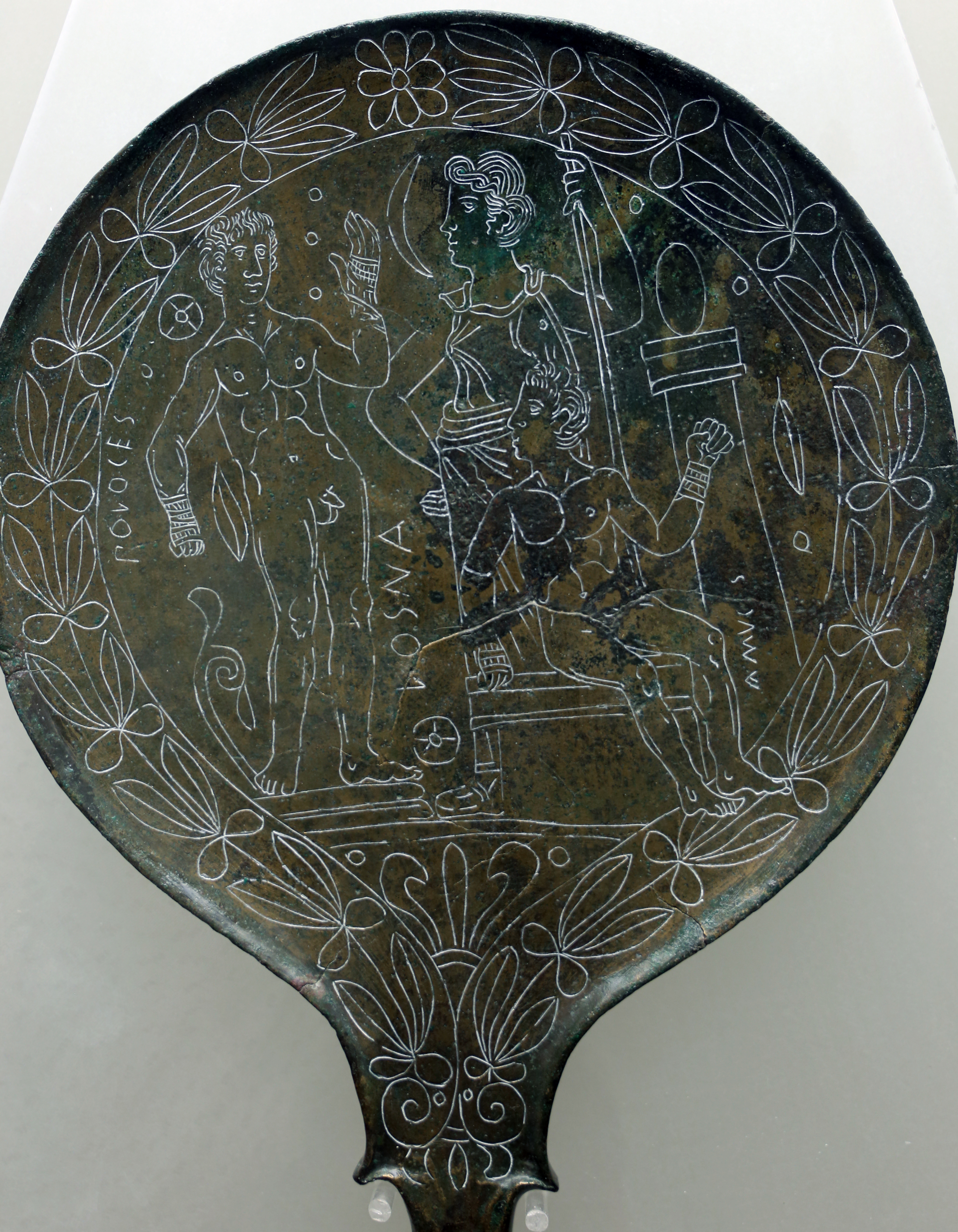
Losna presiding over the contest between Pollux and Amycus on an Etruscan mirror from Praeneste, ca. 310 BC

Losna was the Etruscan moon goddess. She is also associated with the oceans and the tides. She is similar to Greek Leucothea. Losna's Roman equivalent is Luna.

== See also ==
- Luna (goddess)
