= Alignak =

Inuit deity

In the Inuit religion, Alignak is a lunar deity and god of weather, water, tides, eclipses, and earthquakes.

== See also ==
- List of lunar deities
