= Selardi =

Lunar deity of Urartu

Selardi (Sielardi or possibly Melardi, 𒀭𒌍, šelardi=šə) is a lunar deity of Urartu. Until recently, it was generally believed that this deity was female, although some contemporary scholars disagree with this.

Selardi was believed to be the counterpart to the Babylonian moon god, Sin. Nicholas Adontz theorizes that the name "Sielardi" is derived from "Siela," meaning "woman" or "sister," and "Ardi" which means "sun god" in Armenian. He states that in the ancient east, the Moon had been considered the sister of the Sun, rather than his consort.

Other scholars argue that this deity was male and believe his name should be read as Melardi. It has been compared to the name of the prince of Urartu, Melartua, son of Rusa I. It is probably connected to the word "meghard" (մեղարդ, meaning "moon"), mentioned in the medieval Armenian dictionary of Yeremia Meghretsi.

== See also ==
- List of lunar deities
