= Silewe Nazarata =

Moon goddess of Nias Island, Indonesia

Silewe Nazarate is the name of moon goddess of Nias Island, Indonesia. She is the symbolic of life in the universe. The god Lowalangi is her husband. She is compared with Hera of Greek mythology and her husband the powerful god Zeus.

== See also ==
- List of lunar deities
