= Hjúki and Bil =

Pair of characters in Norse mythology

Animation of the Moon as it cycles through its phases

In Norse mythology, Hjúki (Old Norse: [ˈhiu̯ːke], possibly meaning "the one returning to health") and Bil (O.N.: [ˈbil], literally "instant") are a brother and sister pair of children who follow the personified Moon, Máni, across the heavens. Both Hjúki and Bil are solely attested in the Prose Edda, written in the 13th century by Snorri Sturluson. Scholarly theories that surround the two concern their nature, their role as potential personifications of the craters on the Moon or its phases, and their relation to later folklore in Germanic Europe. Bil has been identified with the Bilwis, an agriculture-associated figure that is frequently attested in the folklore of German-speaking areas of Europe.

== Attestations ==
In chapter 11 of the Prose Edda book Gylfaginning, the enthroned figure of High states that two children by the names of Hjúki and Bil were fathered by Viðfinnr. Once while the two were walking from the well Byrgir (Old Norse "Hider of Something") — both of them carrying on their shoulders the pole Simul (Old Norse, possibly meaning "eternal") that held the pail Sæg between them – Máni took them from the Earth, and they now follow Máni in the heavens, "as can be seen from the earth".

Hjúki is otherwise unmentioned, but Bil receives recognition. In chapter 35 of Gylfaginning, at the end of a listing of numerous other goddesses in Norse mythology, both Sól (the personified Sun) and Bil are listed together as goddesses "whose nature has already been described". Bil appears twice more in the Prose Edda book Skáldskaparmál. In chapter 75, Bil appears within another list of goddesses, and her name appears in chapter 47 in a kenning for "woman".

== Theories ==
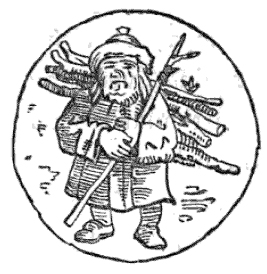
A 19th century drawing of The Man in the Moon from folklore in areas of Germanic Europe

=== Identification and representation ===
As the two are otherwise unattested outside Snorri's Prose Edda, suggestions have been made that Hjúki and Bil may have been of minor mythic significance, or that they were made up outright by Snorri, while Anne Holtsmark (1945) posits that Snorri may have known or had access to a now lost verse source wherein Hjúki and Bil personified the waxing and waning moon. Holtsmark further theorizes that Bil may have been a dís (a type of female deity).

Scholars have theorized that Hjúki and Bil may represent lunar activity, including that they may represent the phases of the moon or may represent the craters of the Moon. Nineteenth-century scholar Jacob Grimm rejects the suggestion that Hjúki and Bil represent the phases of the moon, and states that Hjúki and Bil rather represent the craters on the Moon seen from the Earth. Grimm says that the evidence for this "is plain from the figure itself. No change of the moon could suggest the image of two children with a pail slung over their shoulders. Moreover, to this day the Swedish people see in the spots of the Moon two persons carrying a big bucket on a pole." Grimm adds that:

What is most important for us, out of the heathen fancy of a kidnapping man of the moon, which, apart from Scandinavia, was doubtless in vogue all over Teutondom, if not farther, there has evolved itself since a Christian adaptation. They say the man in the moon is a wood-stealer, who during church time on the holy sabbath committed a trespass in the wood, and was then transported to the moon as a punishment; there he may be seen with the axe on his back and the bundle of brushwood (dornwelle) in his hand. Plainly enough the water-pole of the heathen story has been transformed into the axe's shaft, and the carried pail into the thornbrush; the general idea of theft was retained, but special stress laid on the keeping of the christian holiday; the man suffers punishment not so much for cutting firewood, as because he did it on Sunday.

Grimm gives further examples from Germanic folklore until the time of his writing (the 19th century) and notes a potential connection between the German word wadel (meaning the full moon) and the dialectal employment of the word for "brushwood, twigs tied up in a bundle, esp[ecially] fir-twigs, wadeln to tie up brushwood", and the practice of cutting wood out in the full moon. Benjamin Thorpe agrees with the theory of Hjúki and Bil as the personified shapes of Moon craters.

Rudolf Simek states that the obscurity of the names of the objects in the tale of Hjúki and Bil may indicate that Snorri derived them from a folktale, and that the form of the tale of the Man in the Moon (featuring a man with a pole and a woman with a bushel) is also found in modern folklore in Scandinavia, England, and Northern Germany.

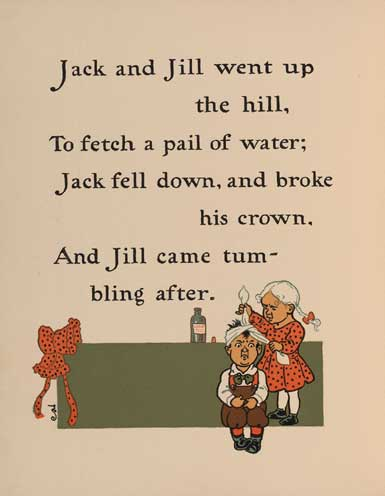
Jack and Jill, proposed as connected to Hjúki and Bil

In both the story Hjúki and Bil found in the Icelandic Prose Edda and the English nursery rhyme "Jack and Jill", two children, one male and one female, fetch a pail of water, and the pairs have names that have been perceived as phonetically similar. These elements have resulted in theories connecting the two, and the notion has had some influence, appearing in school books for children from the 19th century and into the 20th century. A traditional form of the rhyme reads:

Jack and Jill went up the hill
to fetch a pail of water
Jack fell down and broke his crown
and Jill came tumbling after.
Up Jack got and home did trot
as fast as he could caper.
He went to bed to mind his head
with vinegar and brown paper.

=== Bilwis ===
A figure by the name of Bilwis is attested in various parts of German-speaking Europe starting in the 13th century. Scholar Leander Petzoldt writes that the figure seems to stem from the goddess and over time saw many changes, later developing "an elfin, dwarfish aspect and the ability to cripple people or cattle with the shot of an arrow" (such as in Wolfram von Eschenbach's 13th century poem "Willehalm"). Petzoldt further surveys the development of the figure:

During the course of the thirteenth century, the Bilwis is less and less frequently treated as the personification of a supernatural power but becomes increasingly identified as a malevolent human being, a witch. Still later, with the rise of the witch persecution at the end of the Middle Ages, the Bilwis was demonized; she becomes an incarnation of the devil for the witch and sorcerer. A final development has taken place since the sixteenth century, especially in northeast Germany, the Bilwis has been conceived of as a grain spirit bringing wealth; yet this latest manifestation of the Bilwis has its harmful side, the Bilwis-cutter, who is blamed for the unexplained patterns that are formed among the rows of standing grain. The cutter is a sorcerer or witch that cuts down the corn with sickles that are fastened to its feet. He is classified as an essentially malevolent Corn Spirit. Thus, the Bilwis is exceedingly polymorphous, taking on many appearances and meaning in all German-speaking areas throughout the Middle Ages. The Bilwis is one of the strangest and most mysterious beings in all folklore; its varying forms reflect the concerns of a farm culture, and it serves to explain the eerie appearance of turned-down rows of plants in cornfields.

=== Toponyms ===
The village of Bilsby in Lincolnshire, England (from which the English surname Billing derives) has been proposed as having been named after Bil.

== See also ==
- Sinthgunt, a Germanic goddess possibly connected to the Moon
- List of lunar deities
