= Metztli =

Aztec moon deity

- Moon deity
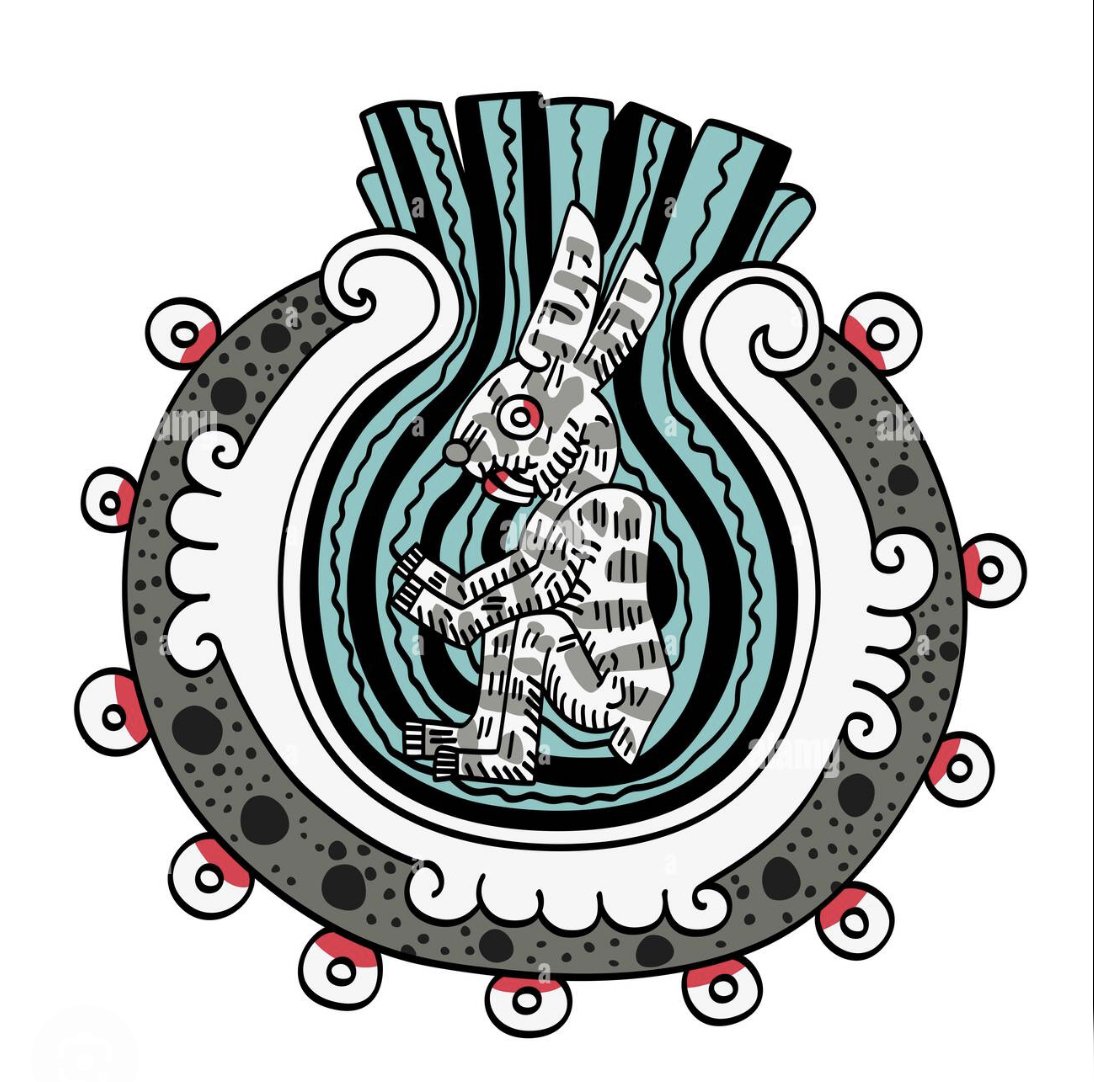
- Metztli as depicted in the Codex Borgia
- Symbol: Moon, rabbit
- Region: Mesoamerica
- Ethnic group: Aztec

In Aztec mythology, Mētztli (Nahuatl: [met͡st͡ɬi]; also rendered Meztli, Metzi, literally "Moon") was a god or goddess of the moon, the night, and farmers.

== See also ==
- List of lunar deities
