= Mihashira Torii =

Shinto torii gate

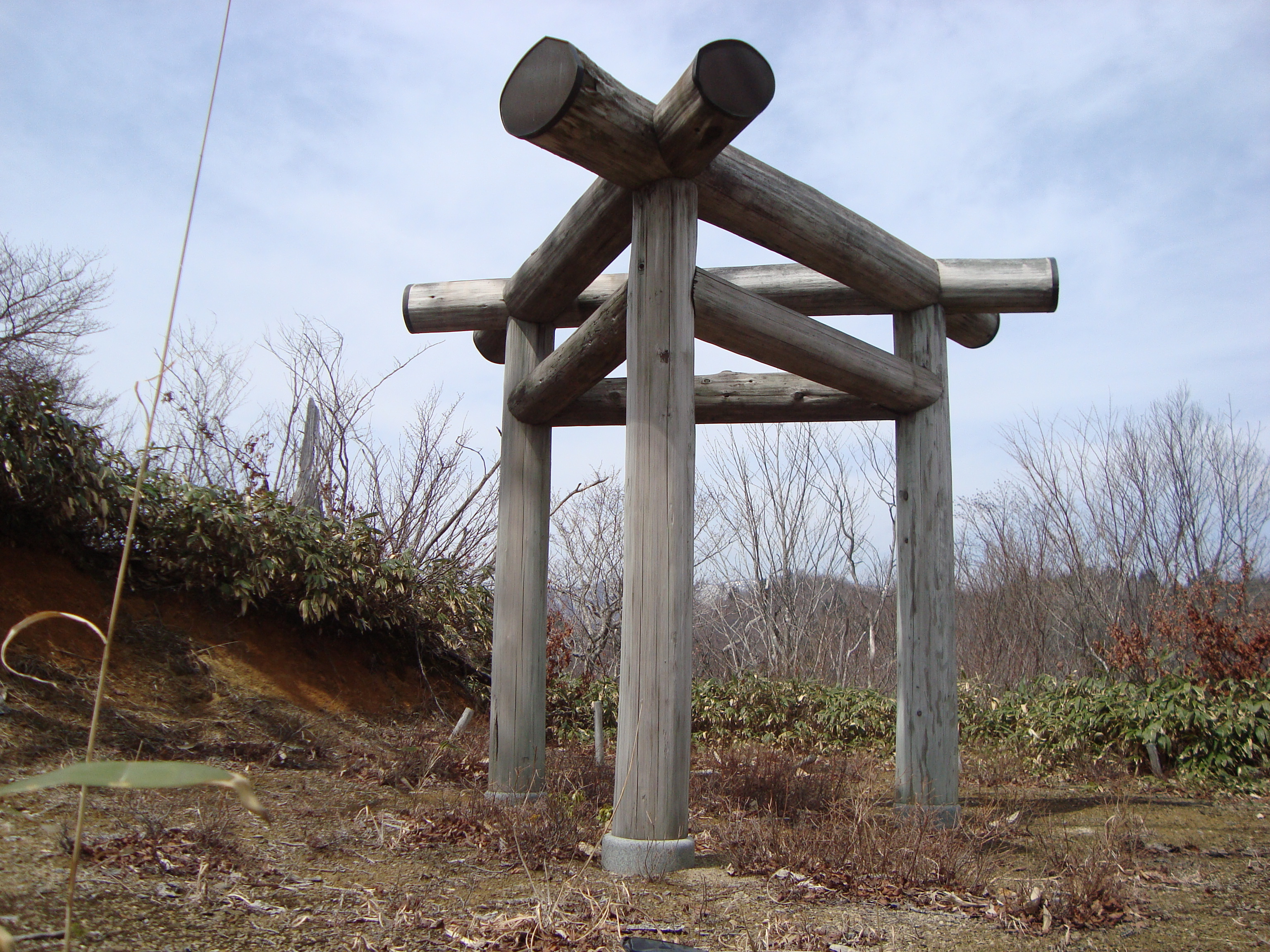
Mihashira Torii at Yamato, Gifu

Mihashira Torii or Mitsubashira Torii (三柱鳥居, Three-pillar Torii; also 三角鳥居 sankaku torii) are a type of torii gate found in Shinto architecture. Like its name implies, it is a triangular structure that appears to be formed from three individual torii. It is thought by some to have been built by early Japanese Christians to represent the Holy Trinity.

== History ==
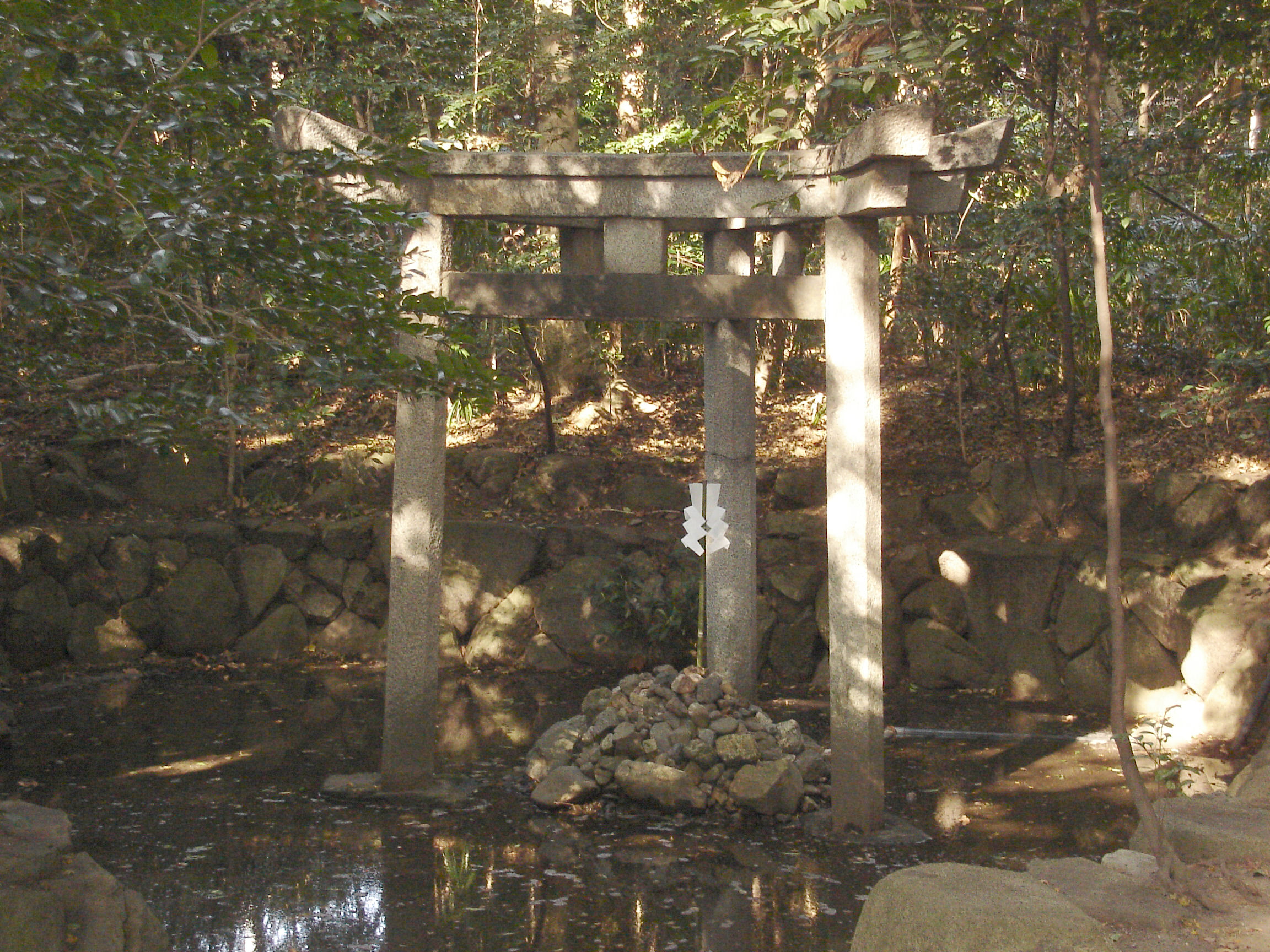
Mihashira Torii at Konoshima Shrine

While the origins of the mihashira torii cannot be directly proven, it is sometimes thought to be linked to early Christianity in Japan.

The primary historical example of a mihashira torii is found in the records of Konoshima Shrine in Kyoto. These records states that a triangular torii was rebuilt in 1716–1736, after a fire. The text hints at a reference to Christianity in the construction of the torii, and says that the three pillars represent the heavens, the earth, and mankind. This is not an interpretation common in Shinto beliefs. The shrine record also holds that the torii symbolizes faith, hope, and charity. The Konoshima torii stands in a pond with a pile of stones in the middle of the structure, supposedly the seat of a God.

A private garden in Kyoto also exhibits a mihashira torii, built in a stream. The Christian owners of the estate claim to be descended from a family of Christians who practiced their religion in secret during a time when Christianity was strictly regulated in Japan. According to them, this type of torii was used as a symbol for underground Christians, and that it represented the Holy Trinity.

== Images ==
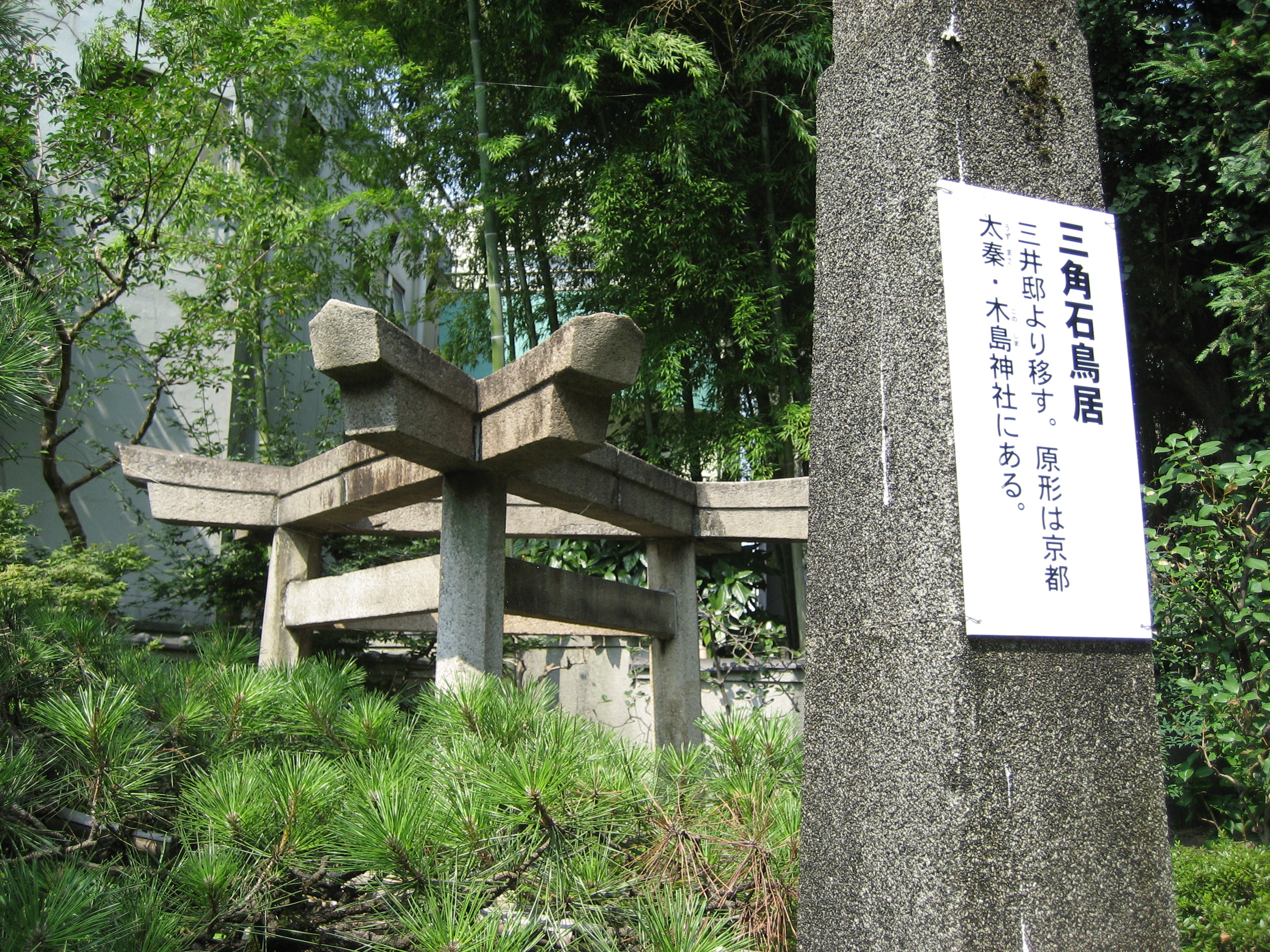
Mimeguri Shrine

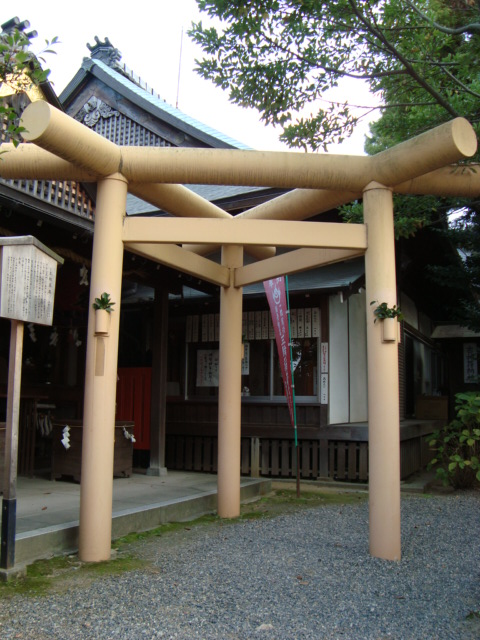
Sakurai, Nara

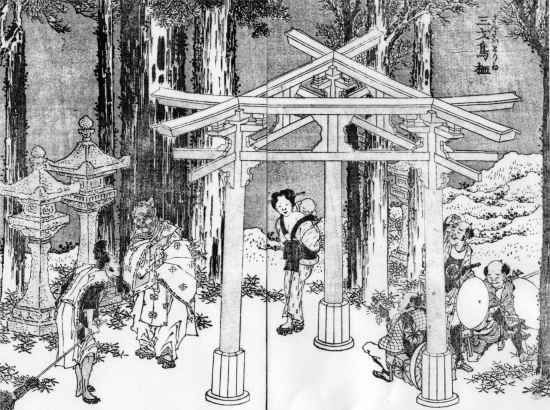
A drawing by Hokusai

== See also ==
- Shinto architecture
- Shinto shrine
