= Anumati (lunar phase) =

Phase of the moon

Anumati refers to a night when the moon remains slightly waxing and not a complete full moon. (Chaturdashi in the Hindu calendar). It happens on the 14th day.
