= Máni =

Moon personified in Norse mythology

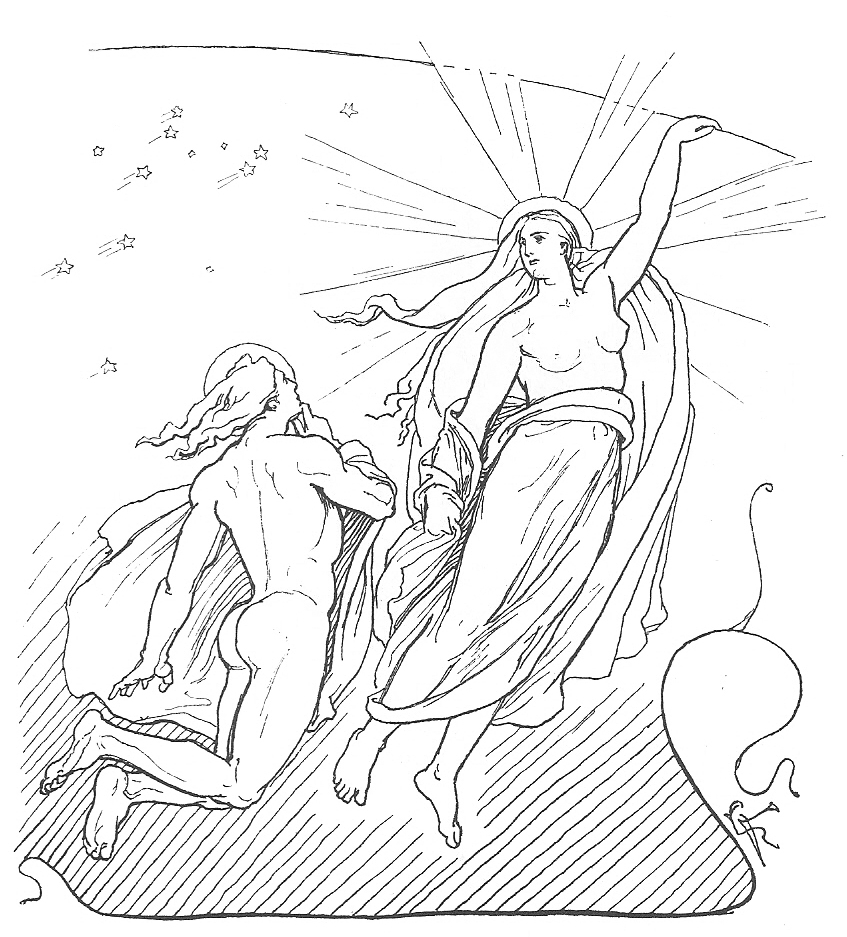
A depiction of Máni and Sól (1895) by Lorenz Frølich.

Máni (Old Norse: [ˈmɑːne]; "Moon") is the Moon personified in Norse mythology. Máni, personified, is attested in the Poetic Edda, compiled in the 13th century from earlier traditional sources, and the Prose Edda, written in the 13th century by Snorri Sturluson. Both sources state that he is the brother of the personified sun, Sól, and the son of Mundilfari, while the Prose Edda adds that he is followed by the children Hjúki and Bil through the heavens. As a proper noun, Máni appears throughout Old Norse literature. Scholars have proposed theories about Máni's potential connection to the Northern European notion of the Man in the Moon, and a potentially otherwise unattested story regarding Máni through skaldic kennings.

== Attestations ==
=== Poetic Edda ===
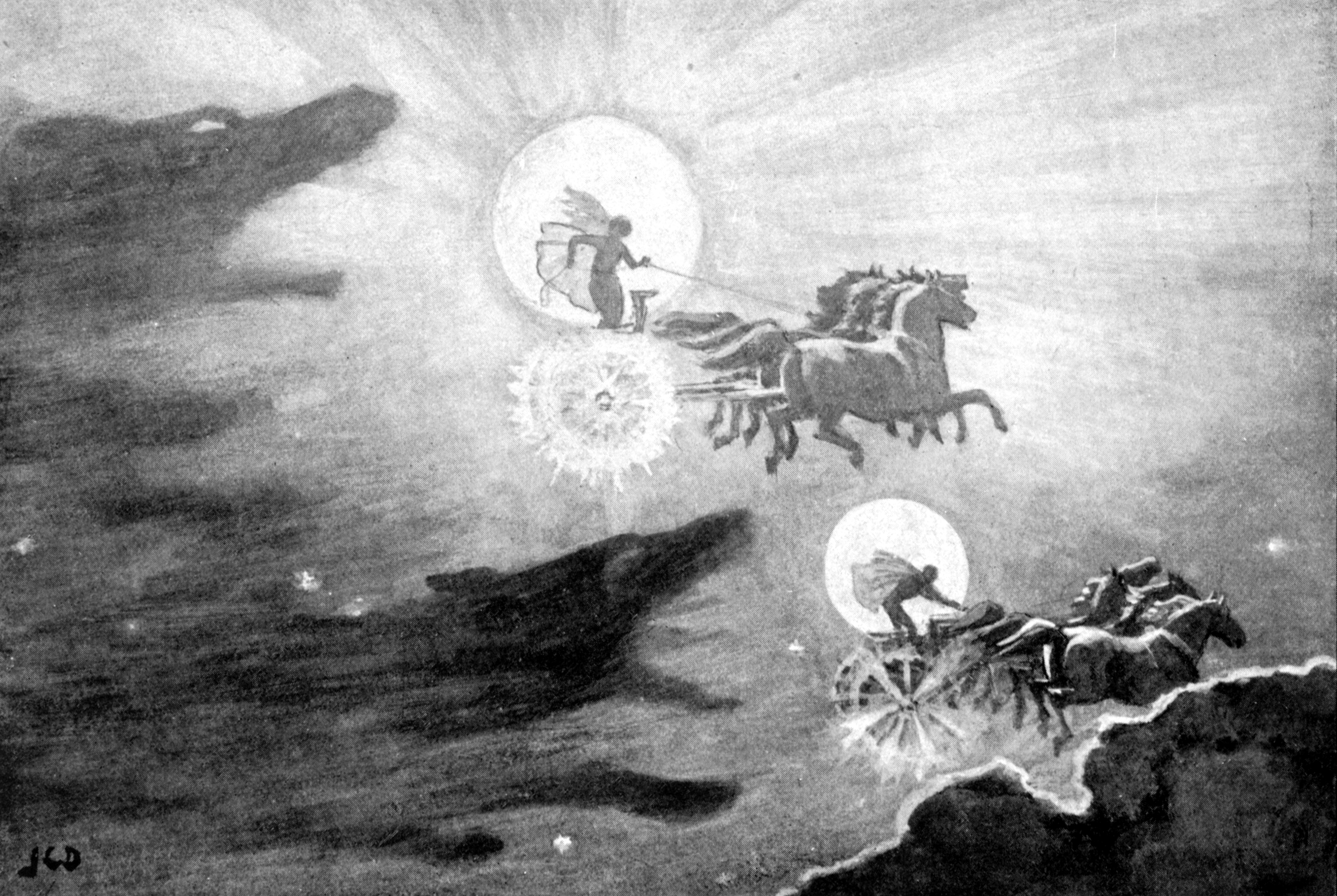
The Wolves Pursuing Sol and Mani (1909) by J. C. Dollman

In the poem Völuspá Odin recounts the history of the universe and foretells the future. In doing so, he recounts the early days of the universe:

Benjamin Thorpe translation:

The sun from the south, the moon's companion,
her right hand cast about the heavenly horses Arvak and Alsvid.
The sun knew not where she a dwelling had,
the moon knew not what power he possessed,
the stars knew not where they had a station.

Henry Adams Bellows translation:

The sun, the sister of the moon, from the south
Her right hand cast over heaven's rim;
No knowledge she had where her home should be,
The moon knew not what might was his,
The stars knew not where their stations were.

In stanza 23 of the poem Vafþrúðnismál, the god Odin (disguised as "Gagnráðr") tasks the jötunn Vafþrúðnir with a question about the origins of the Sun and the Moon, whom he describes as journeying over mankind. Vafþrúðnir responds that Mundilfari is the father of both Sól and Máni, and that they must pass through the heavens every day to count the years for mankind:

Mundilfæri hight he, who the moon's father is, and eke the sun's; round heaven journey each day they must, to count years for men.	"Mundilferi is he who began the moon, And fathered the flaming sun; The round of heaven each day they run, To tell the time for men."

In stanza 39 of the poem Grímnismál, Odin (disguised as Grímnir) says that both the Sun and the Moon are pursued through the heavens by wolves; the Sun, referred to as the "shining god" is pursued by Sköll to the "protecting woods", while the moon is pursued by Hati Hróðvitnisson. In stanza 13 of the poem Alvíssmál, the god Thor questions the dwarf Alvíss about the Moon, asking him what the Moon is called in each of the worlds. Alvíss responds that it is called "moon" by mankind, "fiery one" by the gods, "the whirling wheel" in Hel, "the hastener" by the jötnar, "the shiner" by the dwarves, and "the counter of years" by the elves.

=== Prose Edda ===
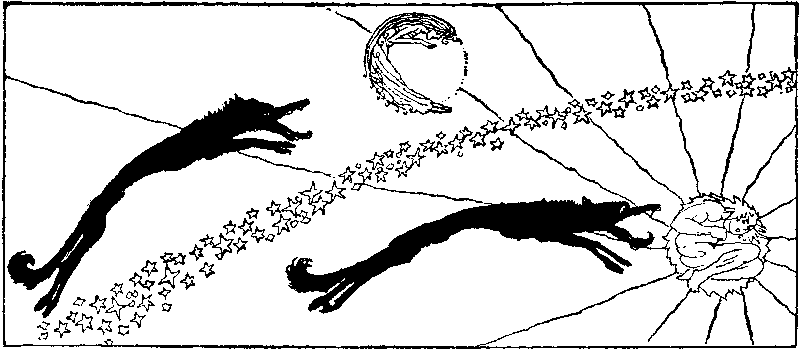
"Far away and long ago" (1920) by Willy Pogany.

In the Prose Edda book Gylfaginning, Máni is referenced in three chapters. In chapter 8, the enthroned figure of High quotes stanza 5 of Völuspá, and the figure of Third, also enthroned, adds that this occurred prior to the creation of the Earth. In chapter 11, High says that Máni and his sister Sól are the children of a man by the name of Mundilfari. The children were so fair that Mundilfari named them "moon" and "sun". Perceiving this as arrogance, the gods were so angered that they placed the brother and sister in the heavens. There, Máni "guides the path of the moon and controls its waxing and waning."

Additionally, Máni is followed through the heavens by the brother and sister children Hjúki and Bil "as can be seen from the earth", whom he took from the Earth while they fetched water from a well. In chapter 51, High foretells the events of Ragnarök, including that Máni will be consumed by one of two wolves chasing the heavenly bodies.

In the Prose Edda book Skáldskaparmál, Sól is referred to in chapter 26 as "sister of Máni", and in chapter 55 names are given for the Moon: "lune", "waxer", "waner", "year-counter", "clipped", "shiner", "gloam", "hastener", "squinter" and "gleamer".

== Theories ==
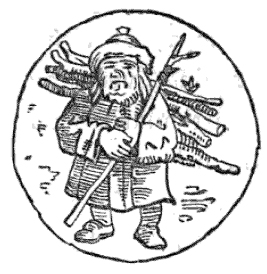
A 19th century depiction of The Man in the Moon from folklore in areas of Germanic Europe

Kennings in the skaldic corpus for female jötnar have been identified (such as "desired woman of Máni" used by the 10th century skald Guthormr sindri) as pointing to a potential marriage or sexual union between Máni and a female jötunn. John Lindow states that if a story about Máni having such a relationship with a female jötunn existed, then "it has left no other trace in the extant mythology. Rudolf Simek states that in two skaldic kennings "Máni is apparently a gigantic being in a myth of which we otherwise know nothing".

John Lindow theorizes on Máni's fate at Ragnarök in that "as part of the creation of the æsir, that is, the cosmos, Máni must be destroyed at Ragnarök, but this is not explicitly stated, except perhaps by Snorri, who tells about Mánagarm, who will swallow a heavenly body that may be the moon".

Rudolf Simek connects the account of Máni, and Hjúki and Bil (featuring, as Simek states, "a man with a pole and a woman with a bushel") found in chapter 11 of Gylfaginning with modern accounts of the Man in the Moon found in modern folklore in Scandinavia, England, and North Germany. Simek additionally points out that a stanza appearing early in the poem Völuspá states that the Æsir had set up the Moon "in order to be able to reckon the year", which Simek connects with Germanic computation of time having been directed towards the Moon rather than the Sun, and that shorter amounts of time were given in nights rather than days.

== See also ==
- Germanic calendar, the lunar calendar of the Germanic peoples
- Monday, the day of the week named after the Moon
- Nótt, goddess of night
- Sunna, the Sun personified as a goddess in Old High German
- Máni, the lunar orbiter mission by ESA and University of Copenhagen
- List of lunar deities
