= Anumati (deity) =

Hindu goddess of the moon and spirituality

In Hinduism, Anumati ("divine favor" in Sanskrit, Devanagari: अनुमति) is a lunar deity and goddess of spirituality. Her vehicle is Krisha Mrigam or Krishna Jinka (Blackbuck).

Dhātā, the seventh son of Aditi, had four wives, named Kuhū, Sinīvālī, Rākā, and Anumati.
