= Tsukuyomi-no-Mikoto =

Moon Kami in Shinto and Japanese mythology

Tsukuyomi
- God of the moon
- Woodblock print of Tsukuyomi
- Other names: Tsukuyomi (ツクヨミ, 月読), Tsukiyomi (ツキヨミ), 月読尊、月弓尊、月夜見尊、月讀尊
- Region: Japan

Genealogy
- Parents: Izanagi (Kojiki); Izanagi and Izanami (Nihon Shoki)
- Siblings: Amaterasu; Susanoo (and others)
- Consort: Amaterasu (some myths)

Tsukuyomi (ツクヨミ, 月読; Japanese pronunciation: [t͡sɨ̥.kɯ̈́.jó̞.mʲí]) or Tsukiyomi (ツキヨミ; [t͡sɨ̥.k̟ʲí.jó̞.mʲí]), also Tsukuyomi-no-Mikoto (ツクヨミノミコト, 月読命; [t͡sɨ̥.kɯ̈́.jó̞.mʲí nó̞ mʲí.kó̞.tó̞]), is the moon kami in Japanese mythology and the Shinto religion. The name "Tsukuyomi" is a compound of the Old Japanese words tsuku (月; "moon, month", becoming modern Japanese tsuki) and yomi (読み; "reading, counting").

The Nihon Shoki mentions this name spelled as Tsukuyumi (月弓; "moon bow"), but this yumi is likely a variation in pronunciation of yomi. An alternative interpretation is that his name is a combination of tsukiyo (月夜; "moonlit night") and mi (見; "looking, watching"). -no-Mikoto is a common honorific appended to the names of Kami; it may be understood as similar to the English honorific 'the Great'.

In Man'yōshū, Tsukuyomi's name is sometimes rendered as Tsukuyomi Otoko (月讀壮士; "moon-reading man"), implying that he is male.

== Myth ==
Tsukuyomi was the second of the "three noble children" (三貴子, Mihashira-no-Uzu-no-Miko) born when Izanagi-no-Mikoto, the kami who created the first land of Onogoroshima, was cleansing himself of his kegare while bathing after escaping the underworld and the clutches of his enraged dead sister, Izanami-no-Mikoto. Tsukuyomi was born when he washed out of Izanagi's right eye. In an alternative story, Tsukuyomi was born from a mirror made of white copper in Izanagi's right hand.

Tsukuyomi angered Amaterasu, who in some sources was his wife, when he killed Ukemochi, the megami of food. Amaterasu once sent Tsukuyomi to represent her at a feast presented by Ukemochi. The megami created the food by turning to the ocean and spitting out a fish, then facing a forest and spitting out game, and finally turning to a rice paddy and coughing up a bowl of rice. Tsukuyomi was utterly disgusted by the manner of which the exquisite-looking meal was made in, so he killed her.

Amaterasu learned what happened and she was so angry that she refused to ever look at Tsukuyomi again, forever moving to another part of the sky. This is the reason that day and night are never together. This is according to one of the accounts in the Nihon Shoki. Tsukuyomi does not have such significance in the Kojiki, in which there is a similar tale about Susanoo-no-Mikoto killing a similar food megami named Ōgetsuhime, who is often conflated with Ukemochi.

== In Tenrikyo ==
In Tenrikyo, Tsukiyomi-no-Mikoto is one of the Ten Aspects of God's Providence (十全の守護, jūzen no shugo).

== Gallery ==
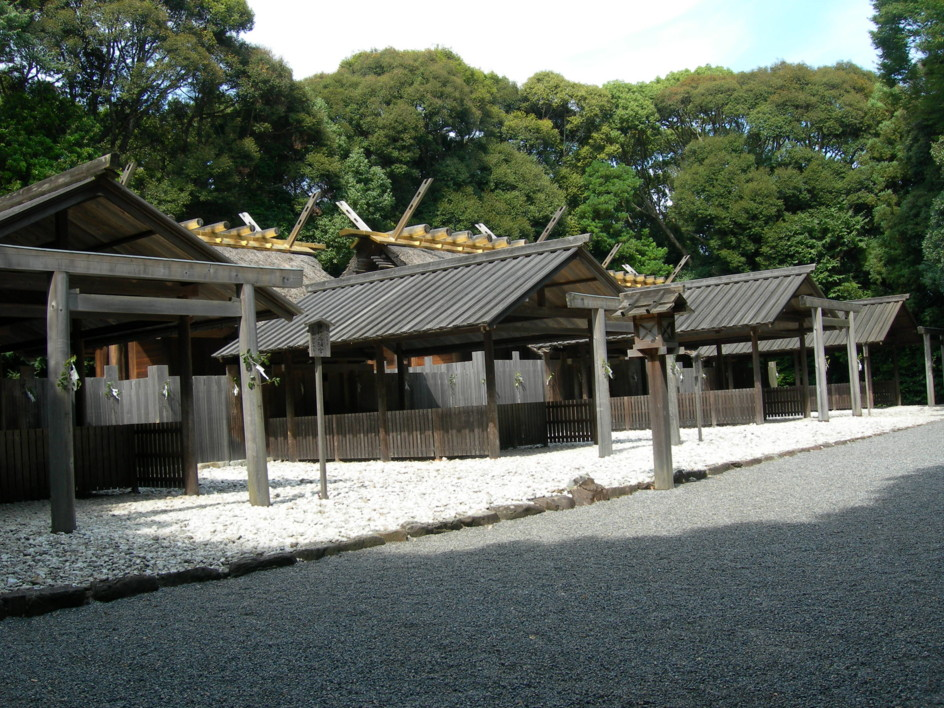
Tsukiyomi-no-miya, auxiliary shrine of the Inner Shrine in Sanctuary of Kotaijingu (Naiku) at Ise city

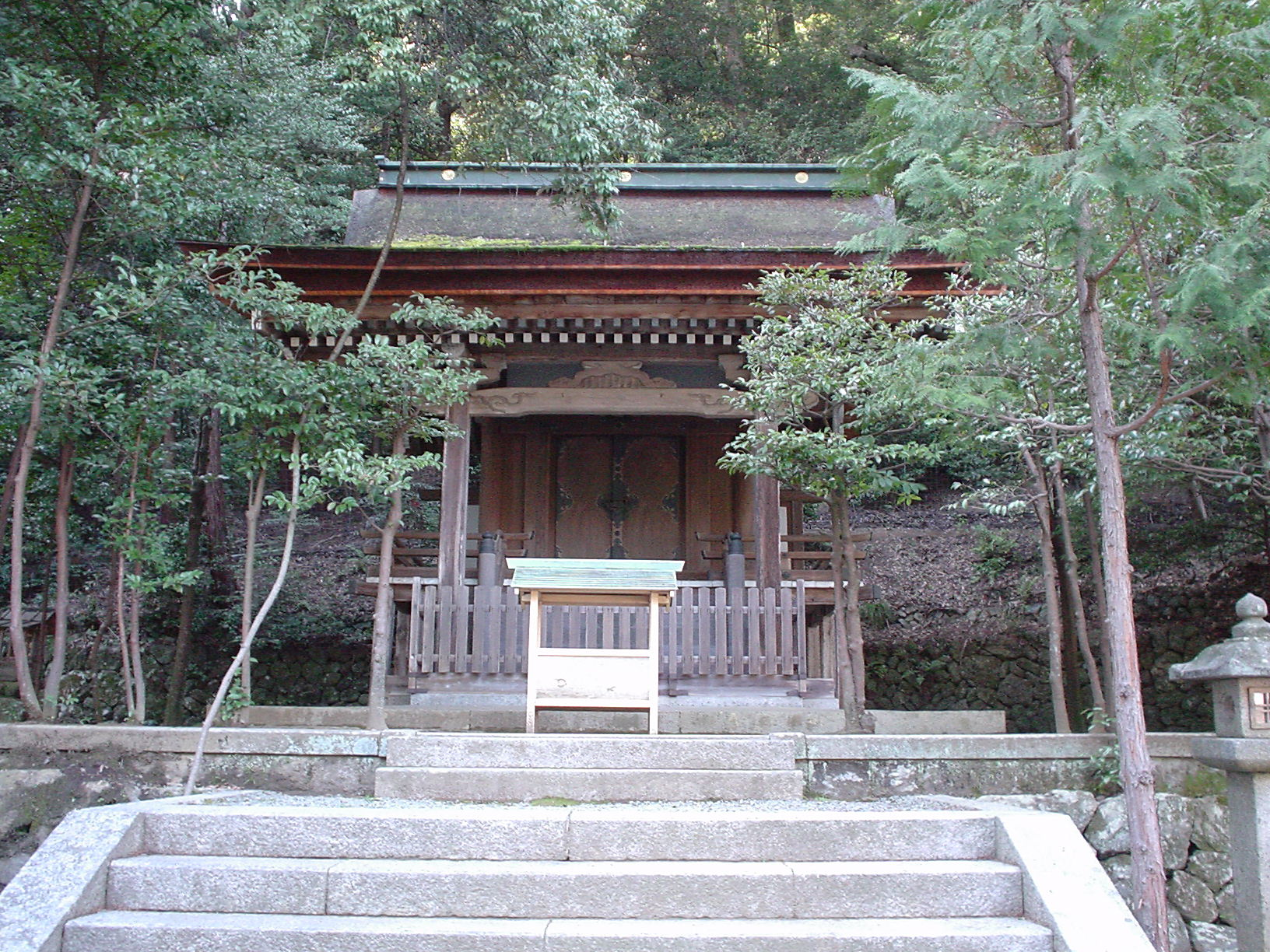
Tsukuyomi Shrine, auxiliary lunar at Matsunoo-taisha in Kyoto

== See also ==
- List of lunar deities
