= Luna (goddess) =

Roman goddess of the Moon

- Goddess of the Moon
- Member of the di selecti
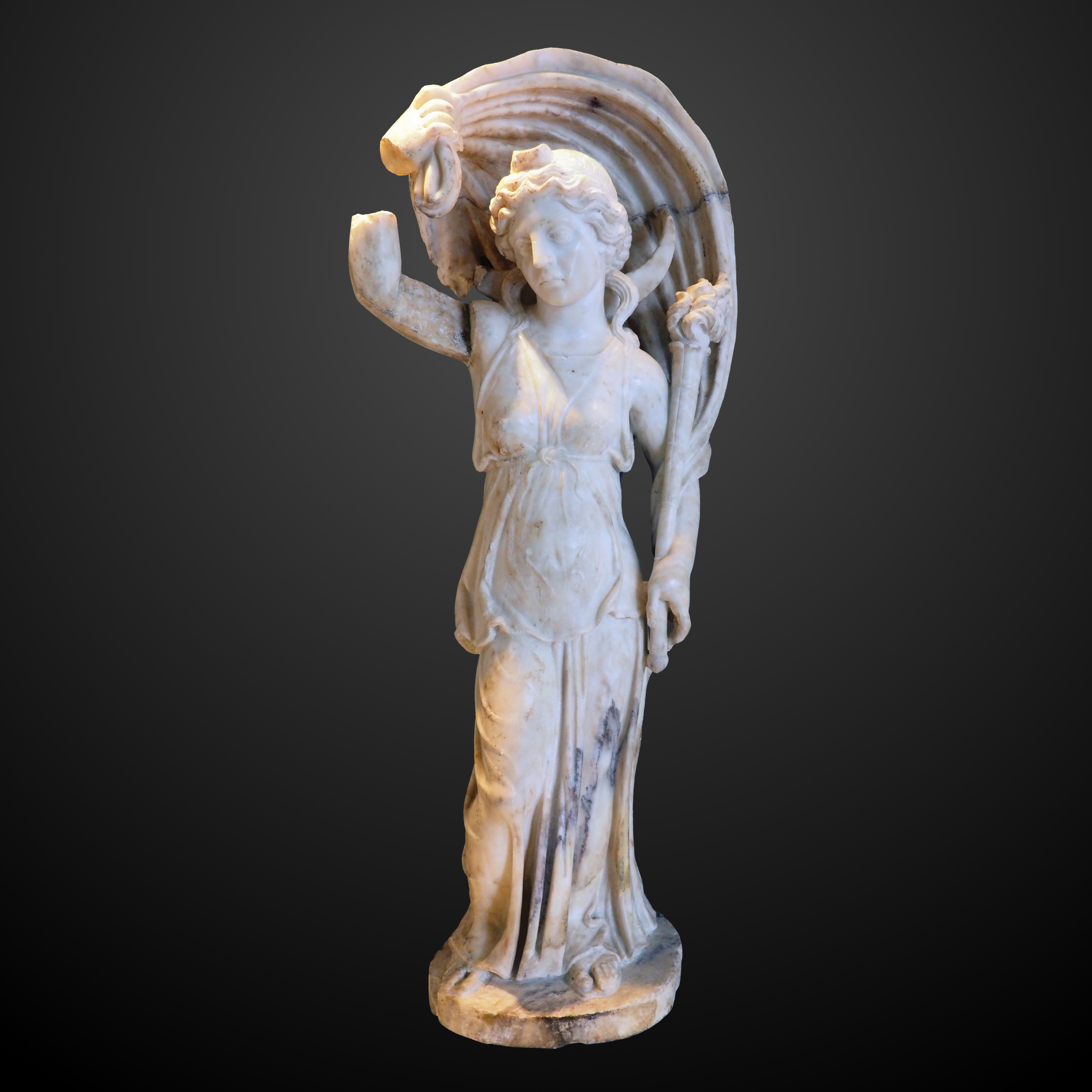
- Luna (AD 150–200, Musée d'Art et d'Histoire de Genève)
- Planet: Moon
- Symbol: Chariot, crescent moon
- Day: Monday (dies Lunae)
- Temples: Aventine Hill, Palatine Hill

Genealogy
- Siblings: Sol, Aurora

Equivalents
- Greek: Selene

In ancient Roman religion and mythology, Luna (Latin: Lūna [ˈluːna]) is the divine embodiment of the Moon. She is often presented as the female complement of the Sun, Sol, conceived of as a god. Luna is also sometimes represented as an aspect of the Roman triple goddess (diva triformis), along with Diana and either Proserpina or Hecate. Luna is not always a distinct goddess, but sometimes rather an epithet that specializes a goddess, since both Diana and Juno are identified as moon goddesses.

In Roman art, Luna attributes are the crescent moon plus the two-yoke chariot (biga). In the Carmen Saeculare, performed in 17 BC, Horace invokes her as the "two-horned queen of the stars" (siderum regina bicornis), bidding her to listen to the girls singing as Apollo listens to the boys.

Luna's Greek counterpart was Selene. In Roman art and literature, myths of Selene are adapted under the name of Luna. The myth of Endymion, for instance, was a popular subject for Roman wall painting.

== Function and worship ==
Varro categorized Luna and Sol among the visible gods, as distinguished from invisible gods such as Neptune, and deified mortals such as Hercules. She was one of the deities Macrobius proposed as the secret tutelary of Rome. In Imperial cult, Sol and Luna can represent the extent of Roman rule over the world, with the aim of guaranteeing peace.

Varro listed Luna and Sol among the twelve de re rustica— deities vital to agriculture. Virgil likewise associated the two gods with agriculture, specifically as clarissima mundi lumina: the world's clearest source of light. Varro additionally named Luna among the twenty principal gods of Rome: the di selecti.

== Cult and temples ==
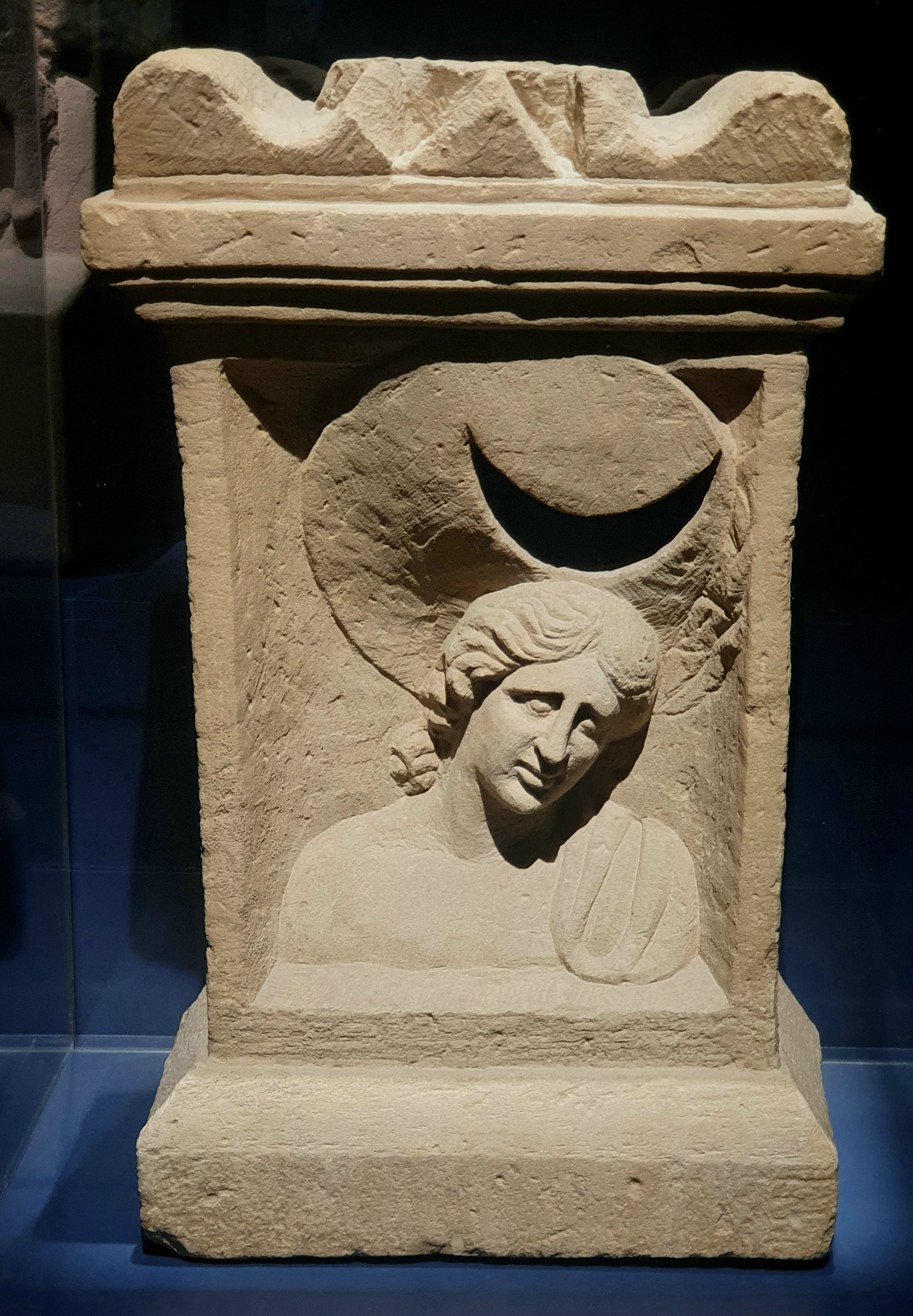
Mithraic altar to Luna (2nd/3rd century)

The Romans dated the cultivation of Luna as a goddess at Rome to the semi-legendary days of the kings. Titus Tatius was supposed to have imported the cult of Luna to Rome from the Sabines, but Servius Tullius was credited with the creation of the Temple of Luna on the Aventine Hill, just below a temple of Diana. The anniversary of the temple founding (dies natalis) was celebrated annually on March 31. It first appears in Roman literature in the story of how in 182 BC a windstorm of exceptional power blew off its doors, which crashed into the Temple of Ceres below it on the slope. In 84 BC, it was struck by lightning, the same day the popularis leader Cinna was murdered by his troops. The Aventine temple may have been destroyed by the Great Fire of Rome during the reign of Nero.

As Noctiluna ("Night-Shiner") Luna had a temple on the Palatine Hill, which Varro described as shining or glowing by night. Nothing else is known about the temple, and it is unclear what Varro meant.

== Chariot of the Moon ==
Luna is often depicted driving a two-yoke chariot called a biga, drawn by horses or oxen. In Roman art, the charioteer Luna is regularly paired with the Sun driving a four-horse chariot (quadriga).

Isidore of Seville explains that the quadriga represents the sun's course through the four seasons, while the biga represents the Moon, "because it travels on a twin course with the sun, or because it is visible both by day and by night—for they yoke together one black horse and one white."

Luna in her biga was an element of Mithraic iconography, usually in the context of the tauroctony. In the mithraeum of S. Maria Capua Vetere, a wall painting that uniquely focuses on Luna alone shows one of the horses of the team as light in color, with the other a dark brown.

A biga of oxen was also driven by Hecate, the chthonic aspect of the triple goddess in complement with the "horned" or crescent-crowned Diana and Luna. The three-form Hecate (trimorphos) was identified by Servius with Luna, Diana, and Proserpina. According to the Archaic Greek poet Hesiod, Hecate originally had power over the heavens, land, and sea, not as in the later tradition Heaven, Earth, and underworld.

== Gallery ==
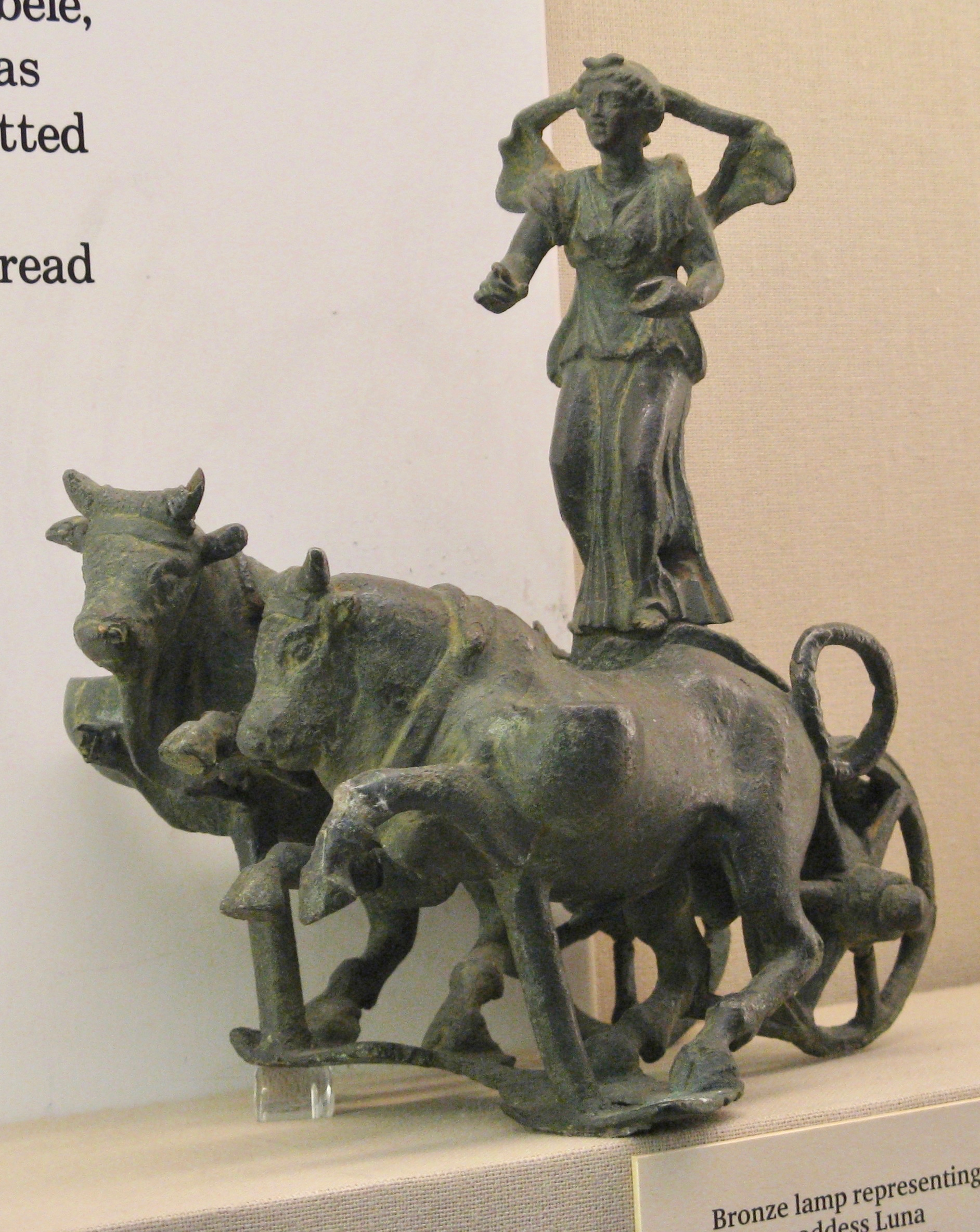
Bronze lamp of Luna and her ox-drawn chariot (1st century AD)

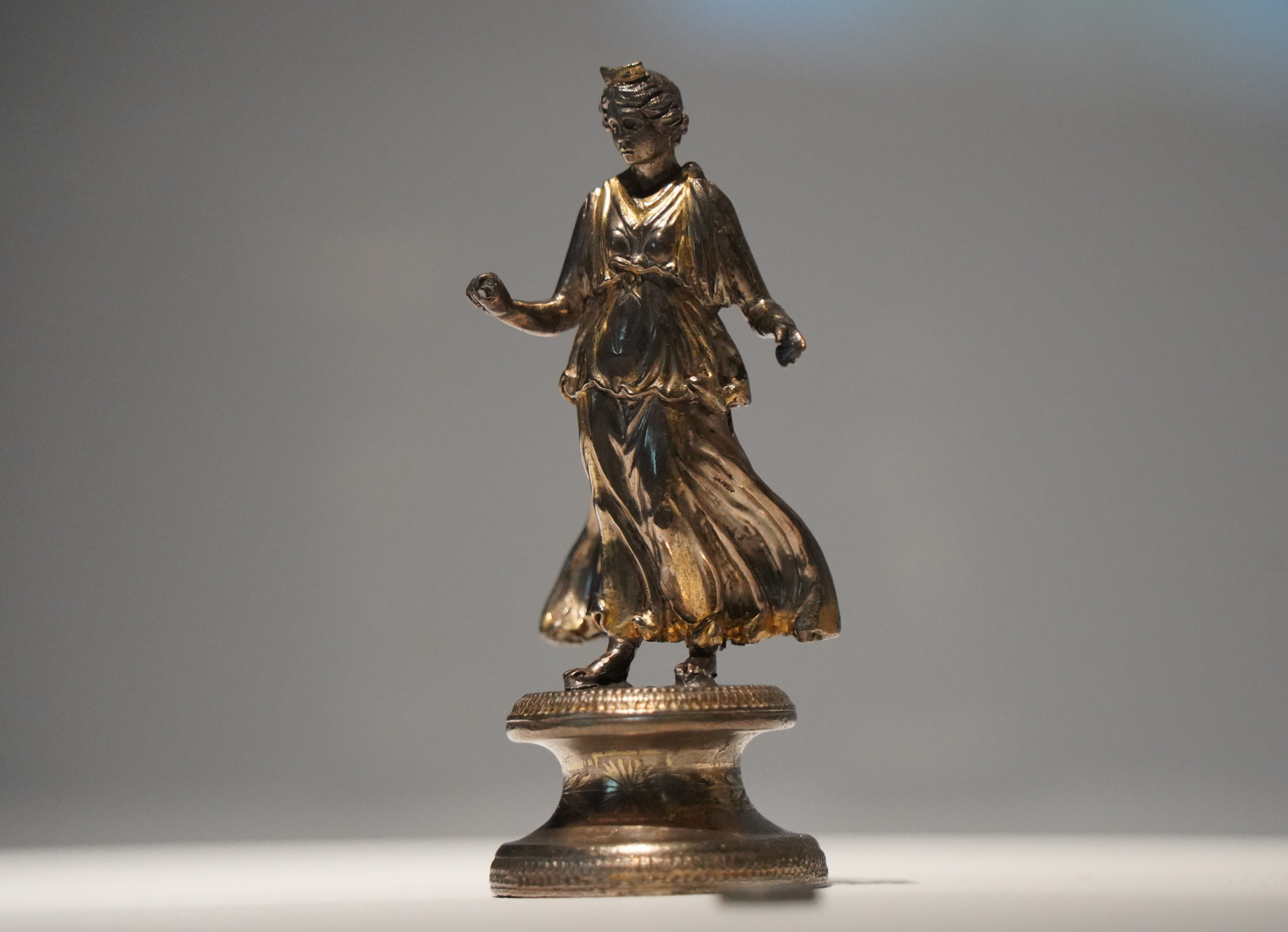
Statuette of Luna from the Mâcon treasure (AD 150–220)

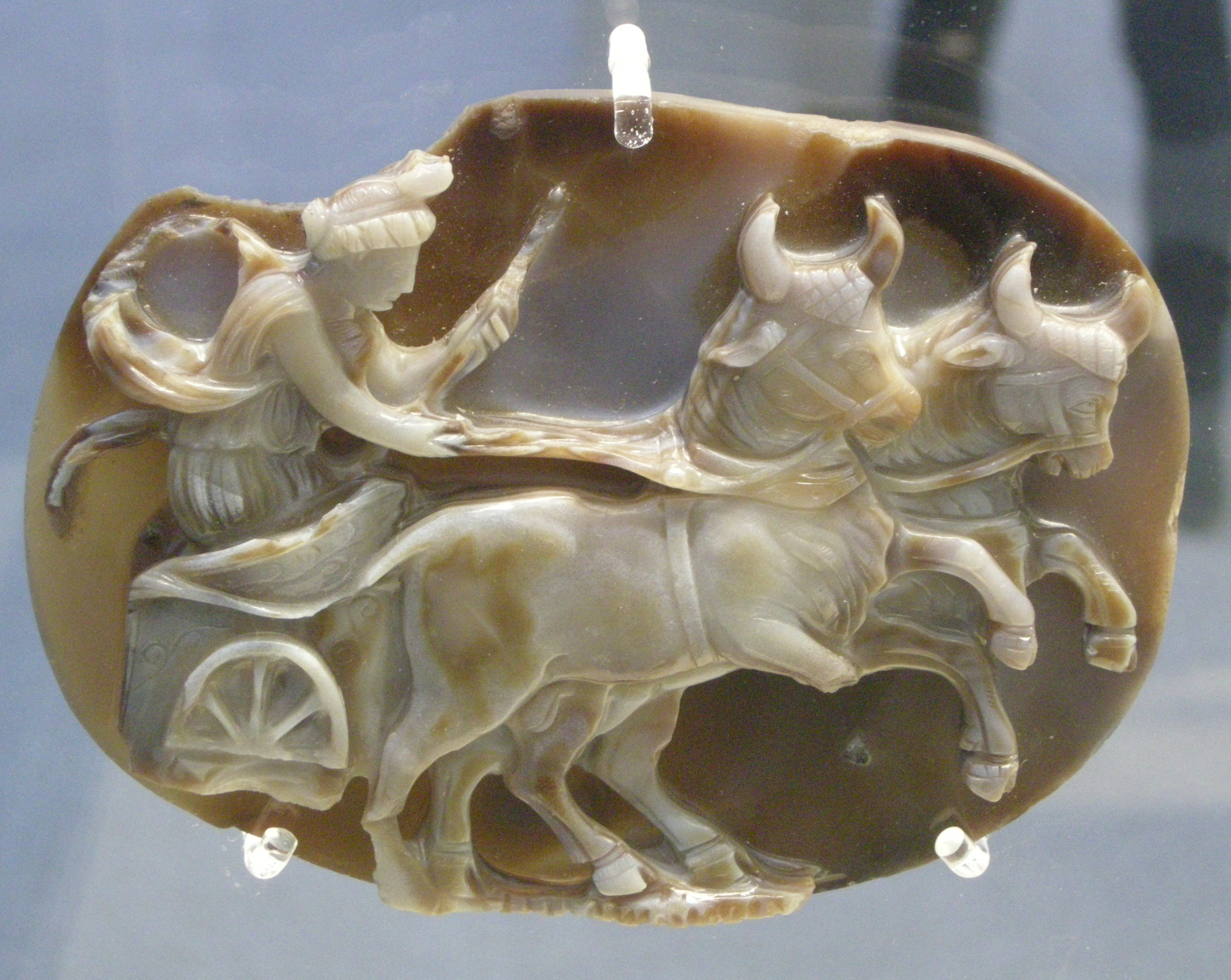
Julia Domna as Luna on a sardonyx cameo (AD 193–217)

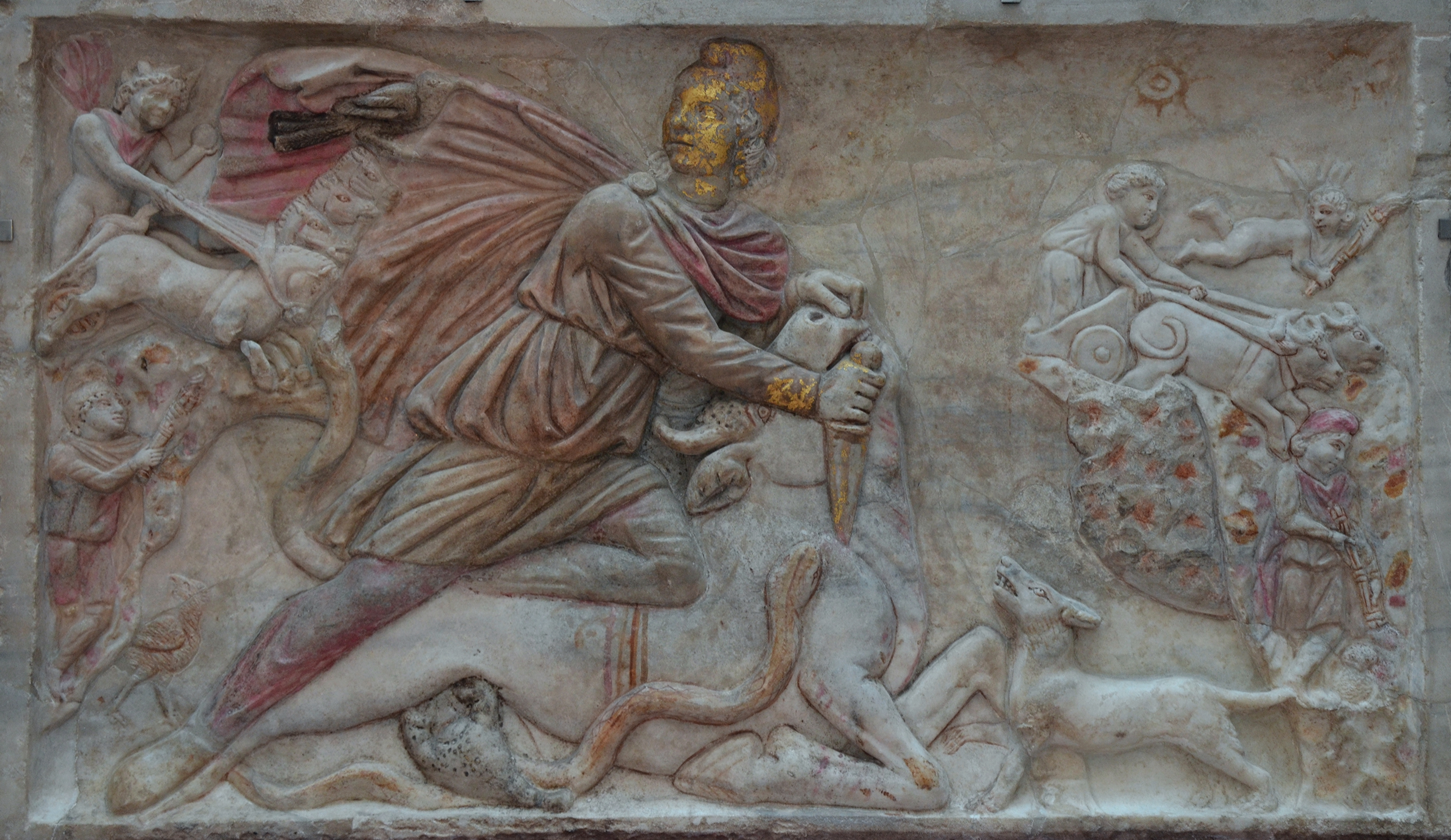
Polychrome tauroctony relief, with Luna driving her ox-drawn biga (right), and the Sun his four-horse chariot (late 3rd century)

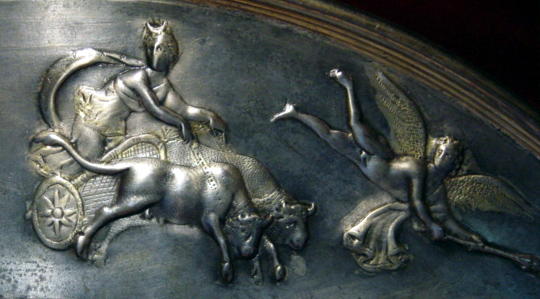
Ox-drawn biga of Luna on the Parabiago plate (2nd–5th century AD)

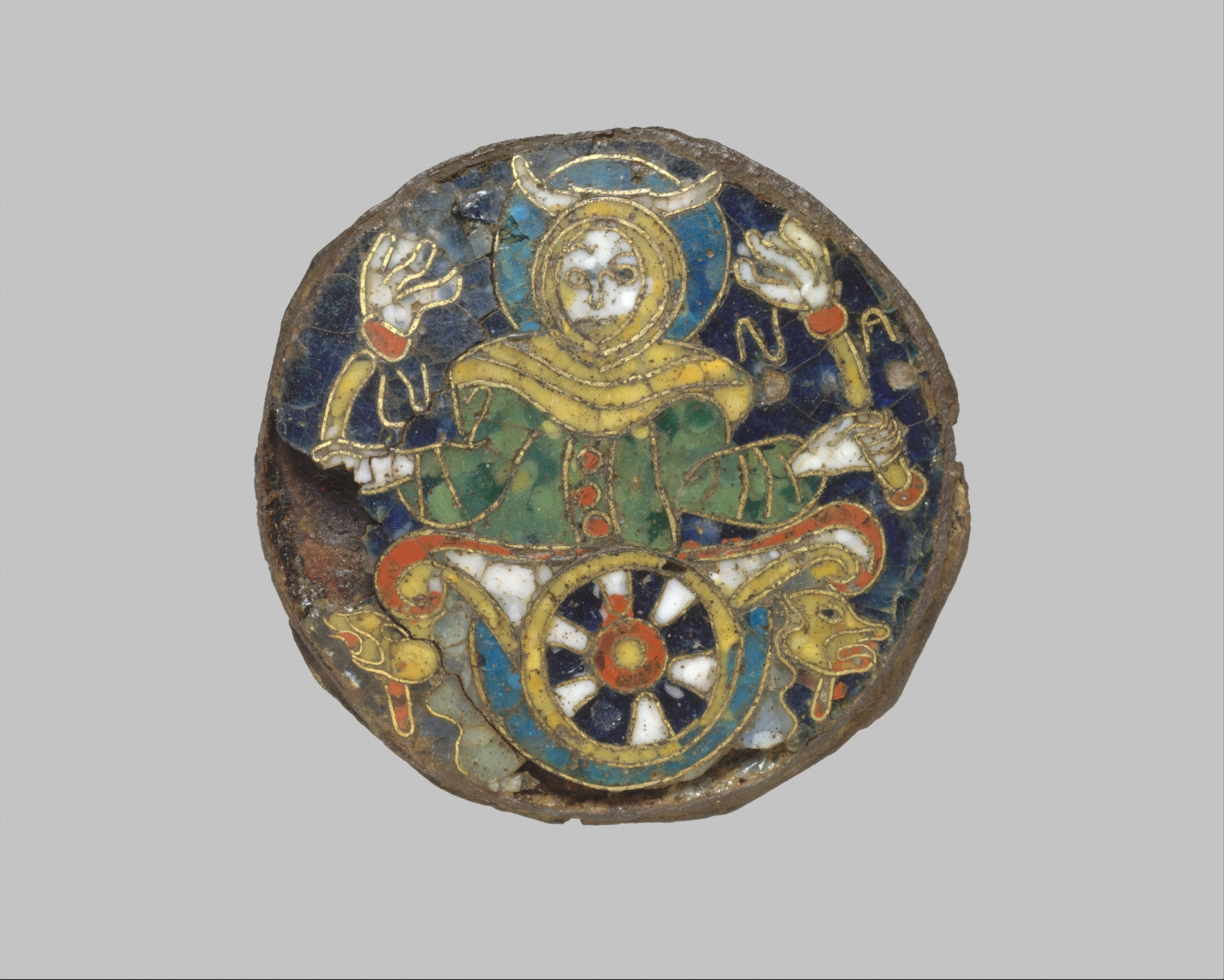
Abstracted Luna and chariot, Carolingian cloisonné roundel (AD 860–890)

== See also ==
- List of Roman deities
- List of lunar deities
