= Lunar deity =

Deity that represents the Moon

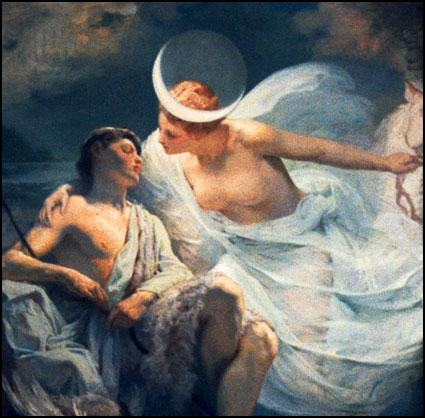
Selene and Endymion, by Albert Aublet

A lunar deity or moon deity is a deity who represents the Moon, or an aspect of it. These deities can have a variety of functions and traditions depending upon the culture, but they are often related. Lunar deities and Moon worship can be found throughout most of recorded history in various forms.

== Moon in religion and mythology ==
Many cultures have implicitly linked the 29.5-day lunar cycle to women's menstrual cycles, as evident in the shared linguistic roots of "menstruation" and "moon" words in multiple language families. This identification was not universal, as demonstrated by the fact that not all moon deities are female. Still, many well-known mythologies feature moon goddesses, including the Greek goddess Selene, the Roman goddess Luna, the Chinese goddess Chang'e, and the Aztec goddess Coyolxāuhqui, whose decapitation may represent a lunar eclipse. Some male gods like Nanna-Sin were linked to childbirth and pregnancy as well. Several goddesses including Artemis, Hecate, Melinoë, Phoebe, Theia and Isis did not originally have lunar aspects, and only acquired them late in antiquity due to syncretism with the de facto Greco-Roman lunar deity Selene/Luna.

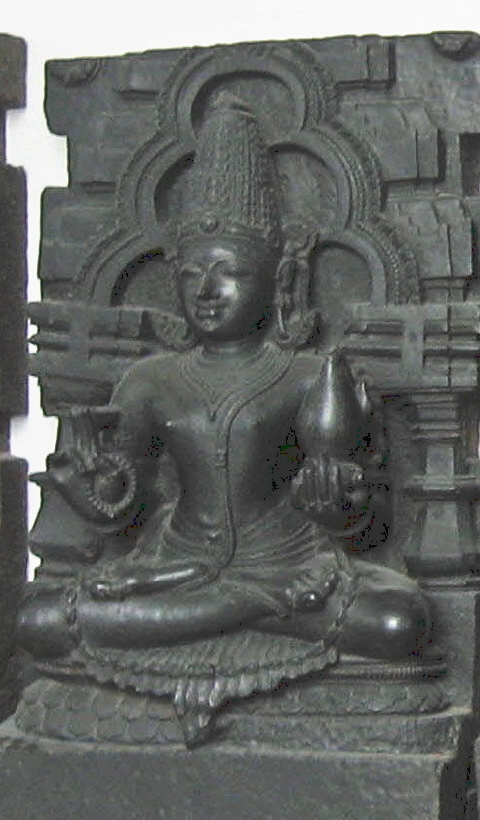
Chandra male lunar deity, British Museum, 13th century, Konark

Male lunar gods are also common, such as Sin of the Mesopotamians, Turks and of the Egyptians (or the earlier Egyptian lunar deity Iah), Mani of the Germanic tribes, Tsukuyomi of the Japanese, Igaluk/Alignak of the Inuit, and the Hindu god Chandra. The original Proto-Indo-European lunar deity, *Meh₁not, appears to have been male, with many possible derivatives including the Homeric figure of Menelaus. Cultures with male moon gods often feature sun goddesses. An exception are Hinduism and Philippine animism featuring both male and female aspects of the solar divine.

The ancient Egyptians had several moon gods including Khonsu and Thoth, although Thoth is a considerably more complex deity. Set represented the moon in the ancient Egyptian calendar. In Bakongo religion, the earth and moon goddess Nzambici is the female counterpart of the sun god Nzambi Mpungu. Metztli, Coyolxauhqui and Tēcciztēcatl are all lunar deities in the Aztec religion.

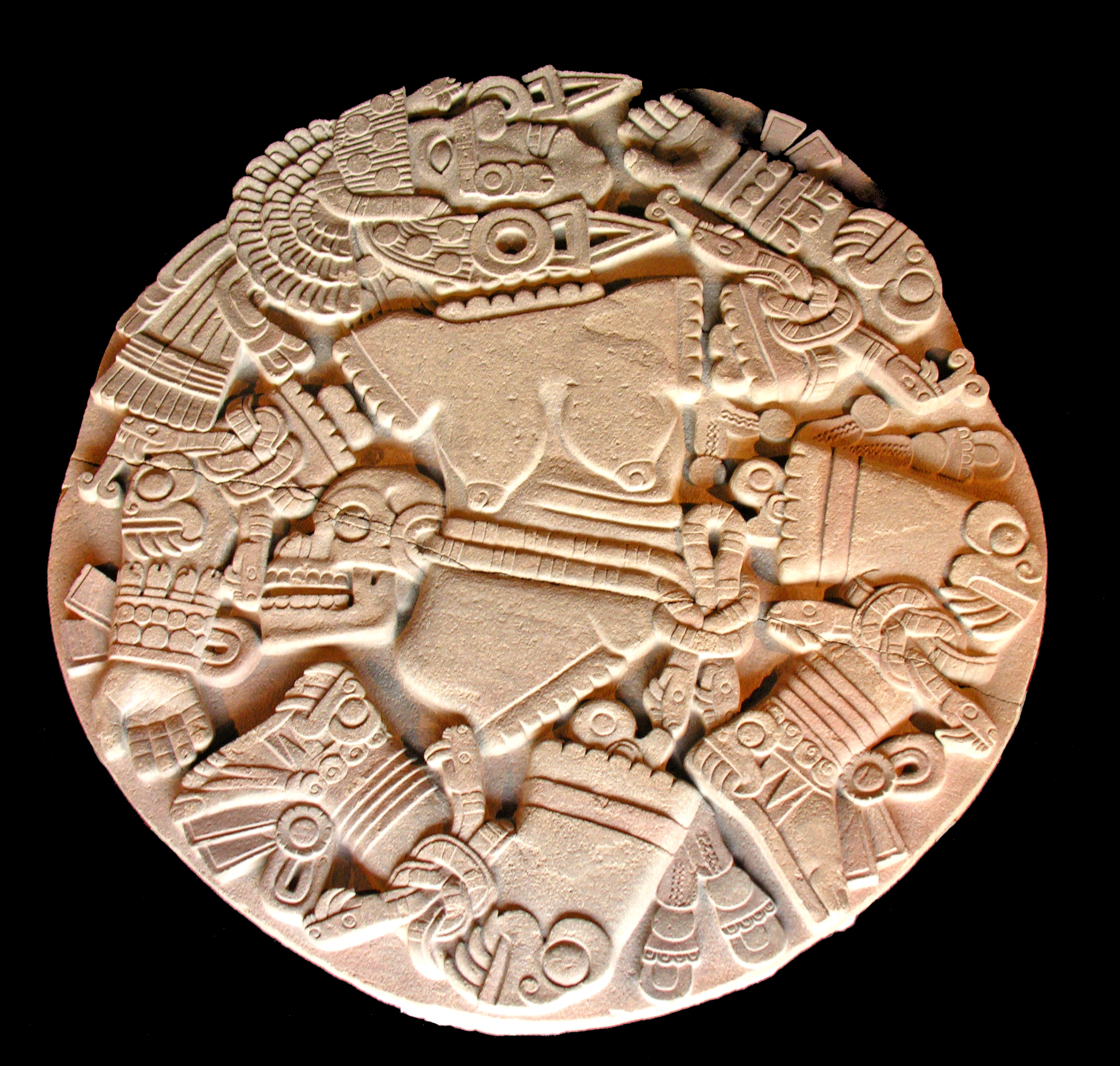
Disk depicting a dismembered Coyolxāuhqui (Coyolxauhqui Stone, c. 1473 CE)

In the Manichean religion, Jesus Christ was worshipped as a lunar deity, often being called the "King of the Moon", or simply "Jesus the Moon".

Many cultures are oriented chronologically by the Moon, as opposed to the Sun. The Hindu calendar maintains the integrity of the lunar month and the moon god Chandra has religious significance during many Hindu festivals (e.g. Karwa Chauth, Sankashti Chaturthi, and during eclipses). Ancient Germanic tribes and the peoples they were in contact with, such as the Baltic Finnic peoples, were also known to have a lunar calendar. Calendars such as the Runic calendar fixing the beginning of the year at the first full moon after winter solstice.

The Moon features prominently in art and literature, often with a purported influence on human affairs.

== Akan mythology ==
The Akan tribes of Ghana personified the moon as Osrane, an ewim abosom, creation of Nyame and twin of Awia (Sun), as well as the brother of Esum (darkness). Whilst Awia, despite his life-giving light, could be wrathful with terrible droughts, Osrane was bright enough to provide light but not so bright that he could not be beheld and admired safely, although he was seen as temperamental, fluid and constantly changing, due to the ever-shifting phases of the moon. He watched over children as they played at night, and all others who were out at night, including nocturnal creatures. Alongside his brother Awia, he was important for time-keeping and the natural cycles of the world. He was married to the Morning Star, and by her the father of the rest of the stars in the sky. A proverb related to the morning star refers to her as 'she who rises early to enjoy her marriage'. He is associated with hares, possibly due to identifications of the lunar maria as the shape of a hare.

== See also ==
- Astrotheology
- Nature worship
- Solar deity
- List of solar deities
- List of lunar deities
