= List of harvest festivals =

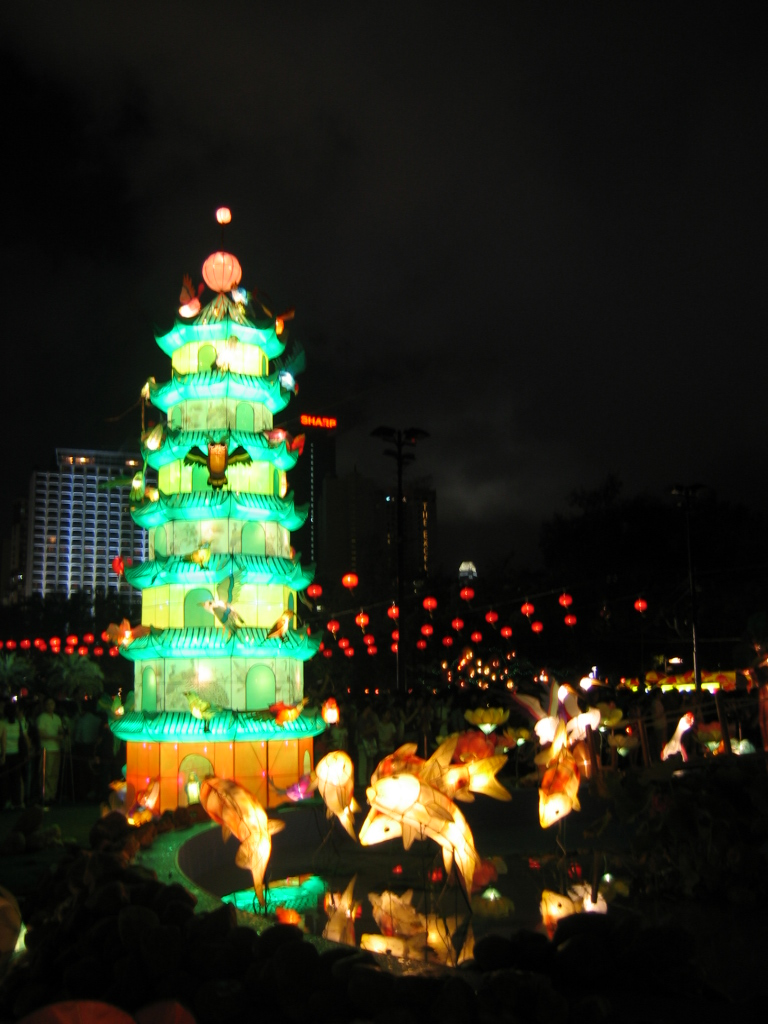
Mid-Autumn Festival celebrations in Victoria Park, Hong Kong

A harvest festival is an annual celebration which occurs around the time of the main harvest of a given region. Given regional differences in climates and crops, harvest festivals can be found at various times throughout the world.

== Africa ==
- Irreechaa: celebrated by the Oromo people in Ethiopia
- Ikore: celebrated by the Yoruba people in Nigeria
- Homowo: a harvest festival celebrated by the Ga people of Ghana.
- Incwala: celebrated by the people of Swaziland
- New Yam Festival (Iwa ji): celebrated by the Igbo of Nigeria
- Umkhosi Wokweshwama: celebrated by the Zulu people of South Africa
- Mokete wa Mokopu: celebrated by the Makgolokwe-a-Mafhleng of South Africa
- Guetna (Juny) : date harvest festival in Mauritania
- Afsay n tmuqqint (24 July) : fig harvest festival in Kabylia and Aures, Algeria
- Timechret uzemur (7 December) : olive harvest festival in Kabylia and Aures, Algeria
- Tfaska n tnunbiya (May) : barley harvest festival in Mzab, Algeria
- Moussem tamrat (October) : date harvest festival at Arfoud, in morocco
- Moussem tamrat fTaghit (October) : date harvest festival in Saoura, Algeria
- Moussem l3nab (August) : grape harvest festival at Benslimane, Morocco
- Moussem lfrizat (May) : strawberry harvest festival in Skikda, Algeria
- Moussem hab lmuluk (Juny) : cherry harvest festival at Sefrou, Morocco
- Moussem louzat (February) : almond harvest festival at Tafraout, Morocco
- 3insla/3insra/3ansert/Tfaska l3ansert (7 July) : wheat harvest festival in all Maghreb (Tunisia, Morocco and Algeria)

== Asia ==
=== East Asia ===
- Mid-Autumn Festival: China; the eighth full moon according to the lunar calendar
- Ilisin: Taiwan, celebrated by the Amis people
- Niiname-sai, Shinjō-sai, Honen Matsuri, Tsukimi: Japan
- Chuseok: Korea

=== Indian subcontinent ===
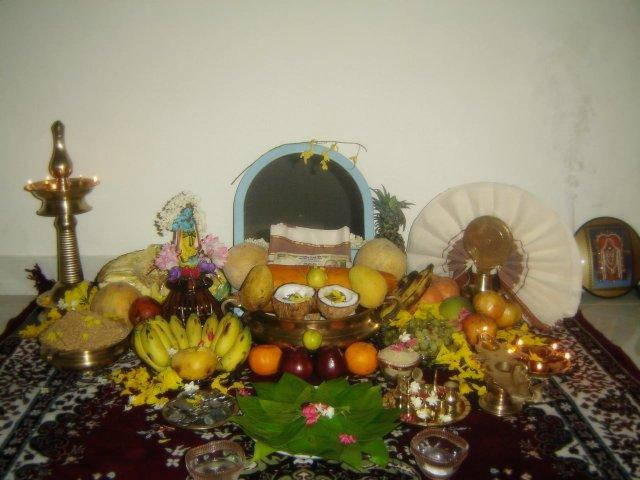
A traditional vishu kani setting, for the Vishu agricultural festival

- Akhatrij (Akshaya Tritiya): celebrated in West India, especially the Gujarat, Maharashtra, Madhya Pradesh, Rajasthan, Goa and Konkan regions
- Nuakhai (Nuakhai): celebrated in Odisha, to welcome the new rice of the season. According to the Kosali calendar it is observed on panchami tithi (the fifth day) of the lunar fortnight of the month of Bhadrapada or Bhaadra (August–September), the day after the Ganesh Chaturthi festival.
- Bhogali Bihu (or Magh Bihu): Assam, marks the end of harvesting season in mid-January
- Chavang Kut: celebrated by the Kuki-chin group in North-east India on 1 November
- Deepoli Parba: celebrated by the Tuluva people from Karnataka/Kerala, India
- Dree Festival: agricultural festival of the Apatanis of Ziro valley in Lower Subansiri District of Arunachal Pradesh, celebrated from 4 to 7 July
- Gudi Padwa: celebrated by the Marathi people in Maharashtra, Karnataka, India
- Holi: Northwest India, especially Uttar Pradesh, Bihar, Telangana, Maharashtra, Rajasthan and Gujarat
- JurShital: Mithila (portion of Bihar and Nepal); 13 or 14 April
- Kanyarkali: agricultural festival of the Malayalee Moothan, Nair and Tharakan communities of Chittur and Alathur thaluks of Palakkad in Kerala, India
- Lohri: North India, especially Punjab
- Monti Fest: celebrated on 8 September; celebrates the Nativity of the Blessed Virgin Mary; in the Mangalorean Catholic community involves blessing of Novem (new crops)
- Nabanna: Bengal region which comprises Bangladesh and West Bengal, India
- Onam and Vishu: agricultural festivals celebrated by Malayali people in Kerala and elsewhere in the world
- Pongal: celebrated by the Tamil people in Tamil Nadu, India and other places (January 14 or 15)
- Puthari / Huthari: Coorg, Karnataka in south India
- Sankranthi or Makar Sankranti: almost all regions of India, including Maharashtra, Gujarat, Karnataka, Andhra Pradesh, Bihar, Madhya Pradesh, Telangana, Uttar Pradesh and West Bengal; celebrated in January; goes by different names in different states
- Traditional New Year: celebration in Sri Lanka coincides with the harvest festival in mid-April
- Ugadi: celebrated by Telugu people in Andhra Pradesh, Telangana and Kannadigas in Karnataka, India
- Agera: celebrated by Bombay East Indians in Mumbai; falls on the first Sunday of October.
- Vishu is the harvest festival in Kerala and celebrated in April - usually 14 or 15 April
- Vaisakhi (or Baisakhi: celebrated by Punjabi people in Punjab, other parts of North India and elsewhere; falls on the first day of Vaisakh month (usually mid-April), and marks the Punjabi New Year
- Pola or Without Amavasya: Celebrated by the farmers of Maharashtra on the last day of month of Shravan. Bullock worship is performed on this day.
- Vasant Panchami: West India, especially Gujarat; celebrated in Nepal, West Bengal, and Bangladesh to invoke wisdom and consciousness; in the Punjab region, it is celebrated as the Basant Festival of kites
- Tokhu Emong: celebrated among Lotha Tribe of Nagaland in India

=== Southeast Asia ===
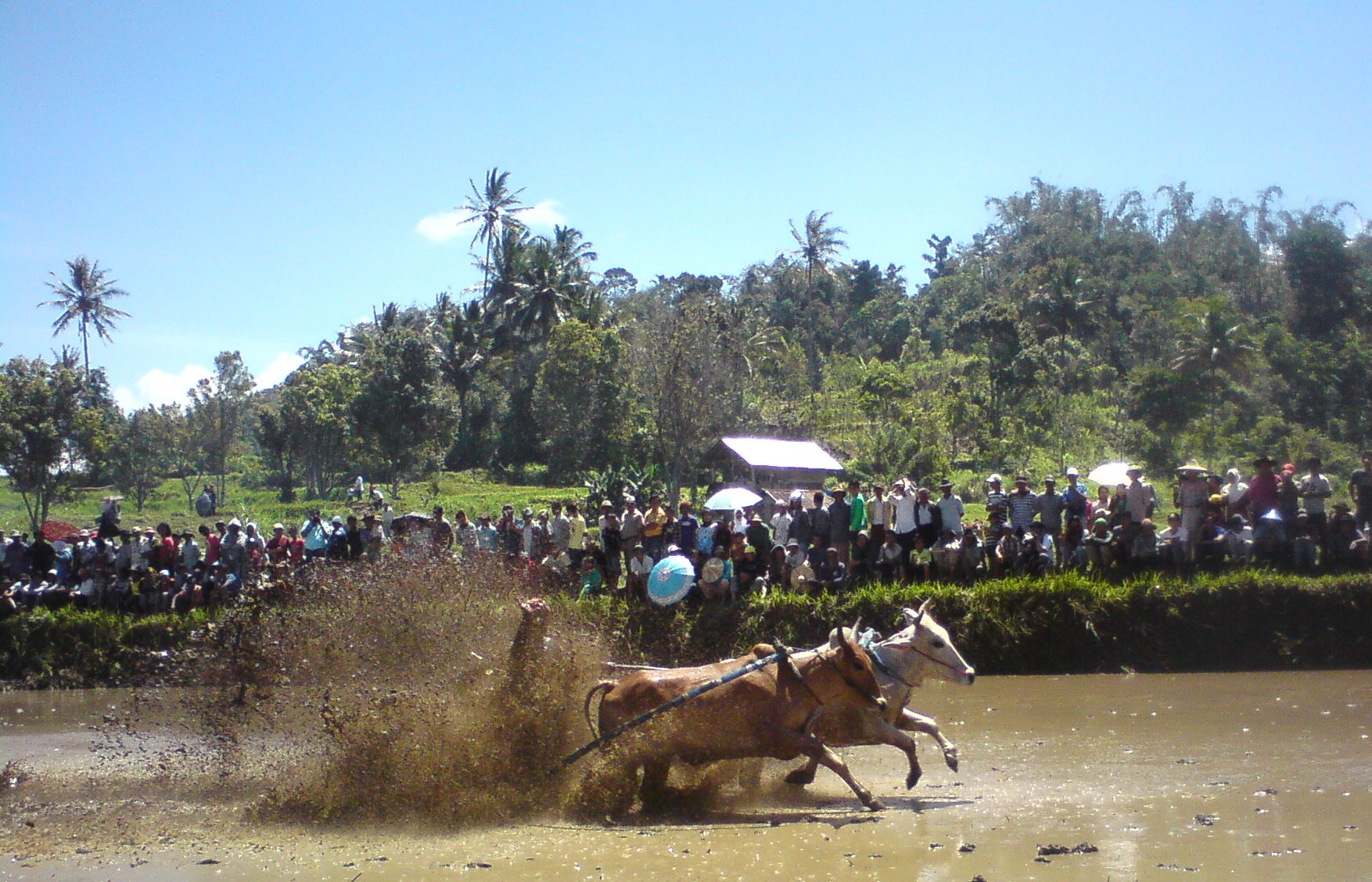
Pacu jawi (bull race), Tanah Datar, Indonesia

- Flores de Mayo: Philippines
- Gawai Dayak: Sarawak, Malaysia and West Kalimantan, Indonesia
- Sipaha Lima: Celebrated by Toba Batak people of North Sumatra, Indonesia. The Christianised version of Sipaha Lima is called Pesta Gotilon, celebrated in Batak Christian Protestant Church and its split-offs.
- Olob Olob: Celebrated by Simalungun people of North Sumatra, Indonesia, usually by the congregations of Simalungun Protestant Christian Church.
- Kaamatan: Sabah, Malaysia
- Kadayawan: Davao City, Philippines
- Khuado: Zomi, Chin State, Myanmar
- Maras Taun: Belitung, Indonesia
- Olob-olob: Simalungun Batak people/GKPS, Indonesia
- Pacu jawi: Tanah Datar, Indonesia
- Pahiyás: Lucban, Philippines
- Seren Taun: West Java, Indonesia
- Tết Trung Thu: Vietnam

=== Middle East ===
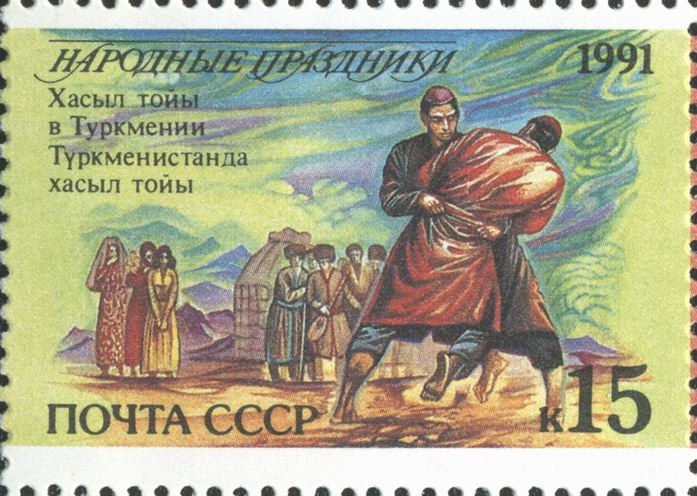
Hasyl toýy, Turkmenistan. Postage stamp, USSR, 1991

- Hasyl toýy (or Hasyl Bayramy): Turkmenistan: traditionally last Sunday in November; observed second Sunday of November since specified in the Labor Code c. 2017
- Mehregan: Iran, Ancient Persia; 2 October
- Sukkot: Jewish harvest festival lasting eight days in the autumn, in which time is spent in tabernacles or booths
- Shavuot: Jewish harvest festival marking the wheat harvest in Israel
- Alaverdoba and Rtveli: Georgia

== Europe ==
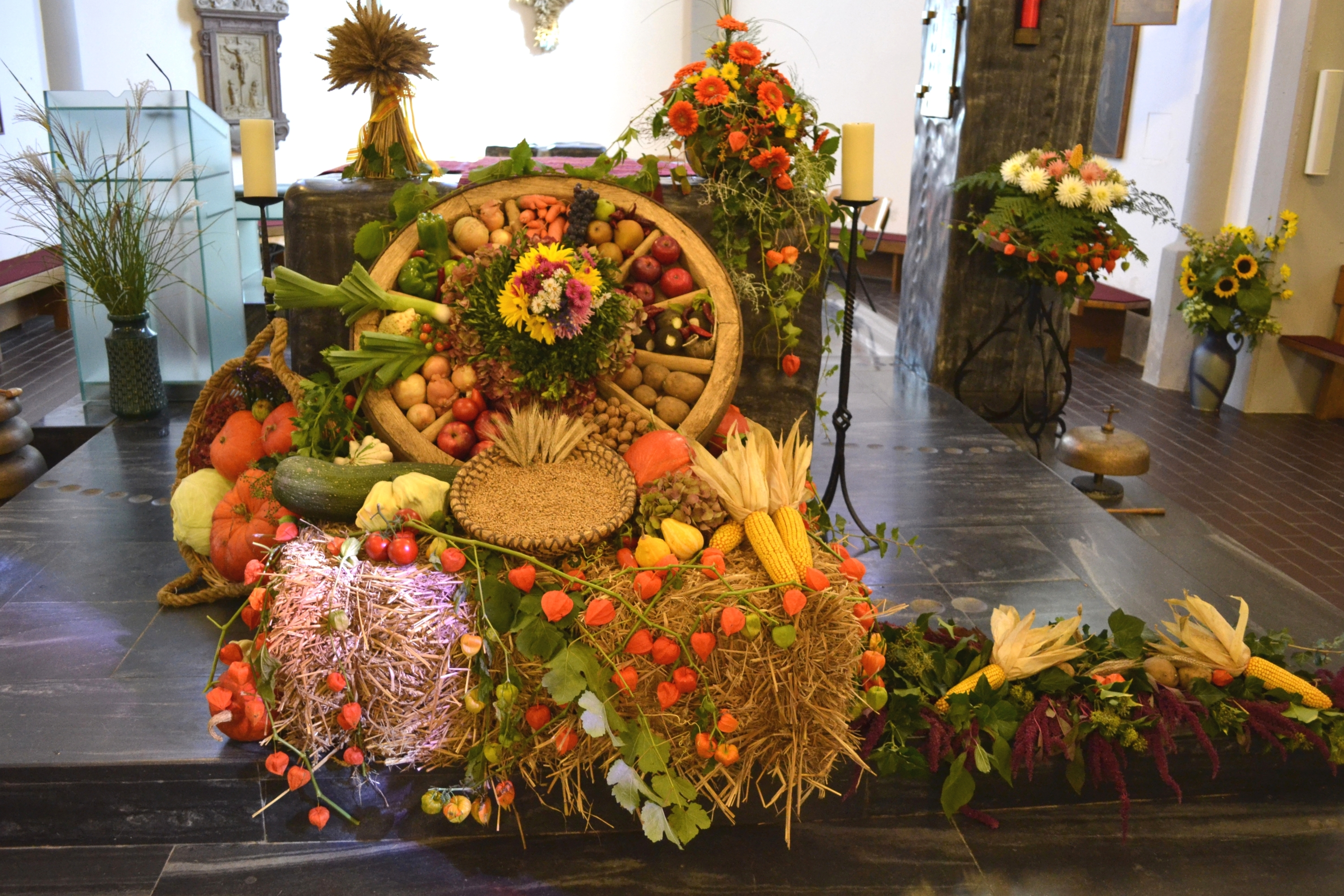
Decoration for ‘thanksgiving’ (Erntedank) in a Catholic church in Upper Austria.

- Bagach (Багач): Belarus
- Bénichon: celebrated (usually by a huge seven-course menu) in Catholic parts of the French-speaking Switzerland; a combined harvest festival, thanksgiving and Rindya (the day when the animals are brought back from the high altitude pastures in the Alps and when all villagers are also therefore back); see fr:Bénichon
- Dankdag voor Gewas en Arbeid: Netherlands, every first Wednesday of November; Thanksgiving Day for crop and labor
- De Pikkeling: Belgium, celebrated in the Faluintjes in the last week of July.
- Dożynki: Poland / Dazhynki: Belarus / Dožínky, Obžinky: Czech Republic / Обжинки (Obzhynky or Obzhynky): Ukraine / Обжинки (Obzhynki), Осенины (Oseniny) : Russia, a Slavic harvest festival celebrated in several central and eastern European countries
- Erntedankfest (Harvest Thanksgiving): Germany and Austria; traditionally on the first Sunday after Michaelmas, this means 30 September or later. At present, Protestant and Catholic churches recommend the first Sunday in October.
  - Erntedankfest Düsseldorf-Urdenbach
- Festa e Grurit (Wheat Festival): used to mark the end of the harvest of wheat in Communist Albania; no longer observed
- Freyfaxi (1 August): marks the beginning of the harvest in Norse paganism; historically from Iceland, the celebration consists of blót, horse races, martial sports, and other events, often dedicated to the god Freyr
- Guldize: Cornwall, United Kingdom
- Harvest festival: United Kingdom
- Kekri: an old Finnish feast celebrated at the beginning of November, corresponding to Halloween
- Lammas or Lughnasadh: celebration of first harvest/grain harvest in Paganism and Wicca spirituality and by the ancient Celts; 1 August
- Mabon (Autumnal Equinox): the second of three recognized harvest sabbats in Paganism and Wicca
- Mhellia: Isle of Man
- Miķeļdiena: harvest festival in Latvia; 29 September; signals the end of summer (Mikeli)

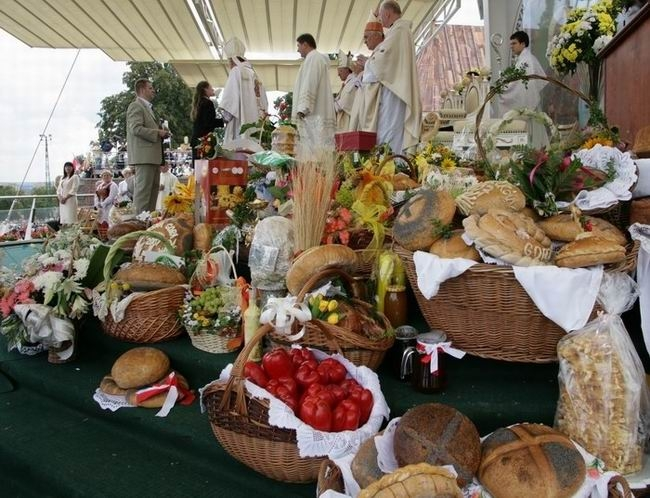
National Harvest Thanksgiving ceremony in Poland's Jasna Góra Roman Catholic sanctuary in Częstochowa, Poland

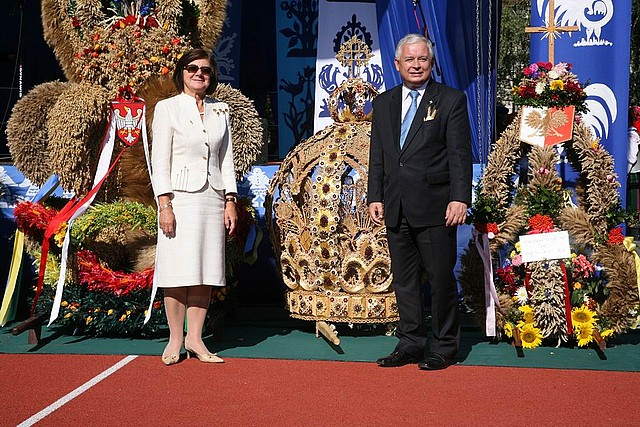
Presidential Harvest Festival in Spala, Poland

- Прачыстая 'Prachystaya': Belarus
- The Presidential Harvest Festival in Spała and Jasna Góra Harvest Festival: Poland, first week of September to begin the first week of October
- Samhain: the third and final of three recognized harvest sabbats in Paganism and Wicca; celebration of the end of the harvest season and beginning of the Celtic New Year; 31 October
- Savior of the Apple Feast Day: Russia, Ukraine; 19 August
- Spice wreath / Cununa de spice: Romania; July
- Szüreti Fesztivál or Szüreti Napok: literally "harvest festival" or "harvest days"; celebrated in various rural towns of Hungary
- Timoleague: annual harvest festival held in August; Tigh Molaige in Irish
- Ziua Recoltei (sau Festivalul Recoltei): Romania; 15 October

== The Americas ==
Region	Festival	Occurrence	Date
Prosser, Washington	Annual Harvest Festival	4th full weekend in September	
New Prague, Minnesota	Dozinky, traditional Czech festival		
Canada	Thanksgiving (Quebec: Action de grâce)	second Monday in October	13 October 2025 12 October 2026; 11 October 2027
United States	Thanksgiving	fourth Thursday in November	27 November 2025 26 November 2026; 25 November 2027
New England region of the United States	Old Home Week	variable date in the fall season	

=== Caribbean ===
- Crop Over: Barbados

=== South America ===
- Fiesta Nacional de la Vendimia: Argentina
- Festa Junina: Brazil
