= Mid-Autumn Festival (disambiguation) =

Mid-Autumn Festival is a Chinese harvest festival. Other festivals which may also be known by the same English name are:

- Chuseok, a Korean harvest festival
- Tsukimi, a Japanese harvest festival
- Tết Trung Thu, a Vietnamese mid-autumn harvest festival
