= Agera =

Agera may refer to:

- Agera (festival), a thanksgiving harvest festival in Mumbai
- Priscilla Agera (born 1978), Nigerian volleyball player
- Koenigsegg Agera, a 2010–2018 Swedish mid-engine sports car

== See also ==
- Agara (disambiguation)
- Agora (disambiguation)
- Agra (disambiguation)
