= Tết Trung Thu =

Vietnamese holiday, the full moon of the 8th lunar calendar

Tết Trung Thu (節中秋)
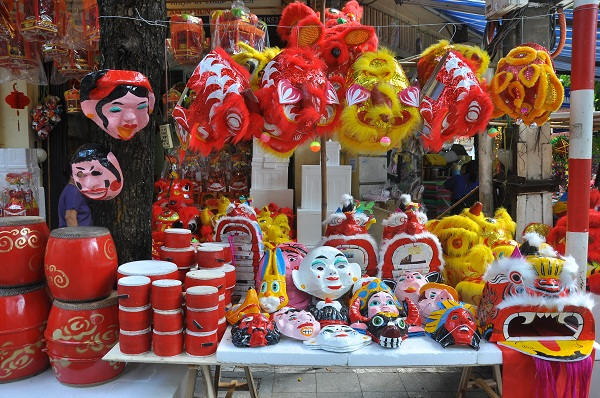
- Children's toys during the Tết Trung Thu
- Official name: Tết Trung Thu
- Also called: Tết Trông Trăng, Tết Hoa Đăng, Tết Đoàn Viên, Tết Thiếu Nhi or Tết Trẻ Con
- Observed by: Viet people
- Type: Cultural, Asian
- Celebrations: making offerings to ancestors, mooncake making and sharing, Moon viewing, hanging lanterns, lantern processions, lion processions, carp processions, trống quân singing, gift-giving
- Date: the night of the 14th to the end of the 15th of the 8th lunar month (Rằm tháng Tám)
- 2025 date: 6 October
- 2026 date: 25 September
- 2027 date: 15 September
- Frequency: Annual
- Related to: Mid-Autumn Festival (in China); Tsukimi (in Japan); Chuseok (in Korea); Uposatha of Ashvini/Krittika (similar festivals that generally occur on the same day in Cambodia, India, Sri Lanka, Myanmar, Laos, and Thailand)

Tết Trung Thu (chữ Hán: 節中秋) is a traditional Vietnamese festival held from the night of the 14th to the end of the 15th of the 8th lunar month (Rằm tháng Tám, chữ Nôm: 𠄻躺渗). Despite its Chinese origin, the festival has recently evolved into a children's festival (Tết Thiếu Nhi), also known as Tết Trông Trăng, Tết Đoàn Viên or Tết Hoa Đăng. Children look forward to this day because they are often given toys by adults, typically including a star lamp, a mask, a kéo quân lamp, and a tò he (edible toy figurines), and eat bánh trung thu (mooncakes – bánh nướng and bánh dẻo). People organize a feast to watch the Moon and when the Moon is high, children sing and dance while watching the full moon. In some places people also organize lion dances or dragon dances for the children to enjoy.

== Origins ==
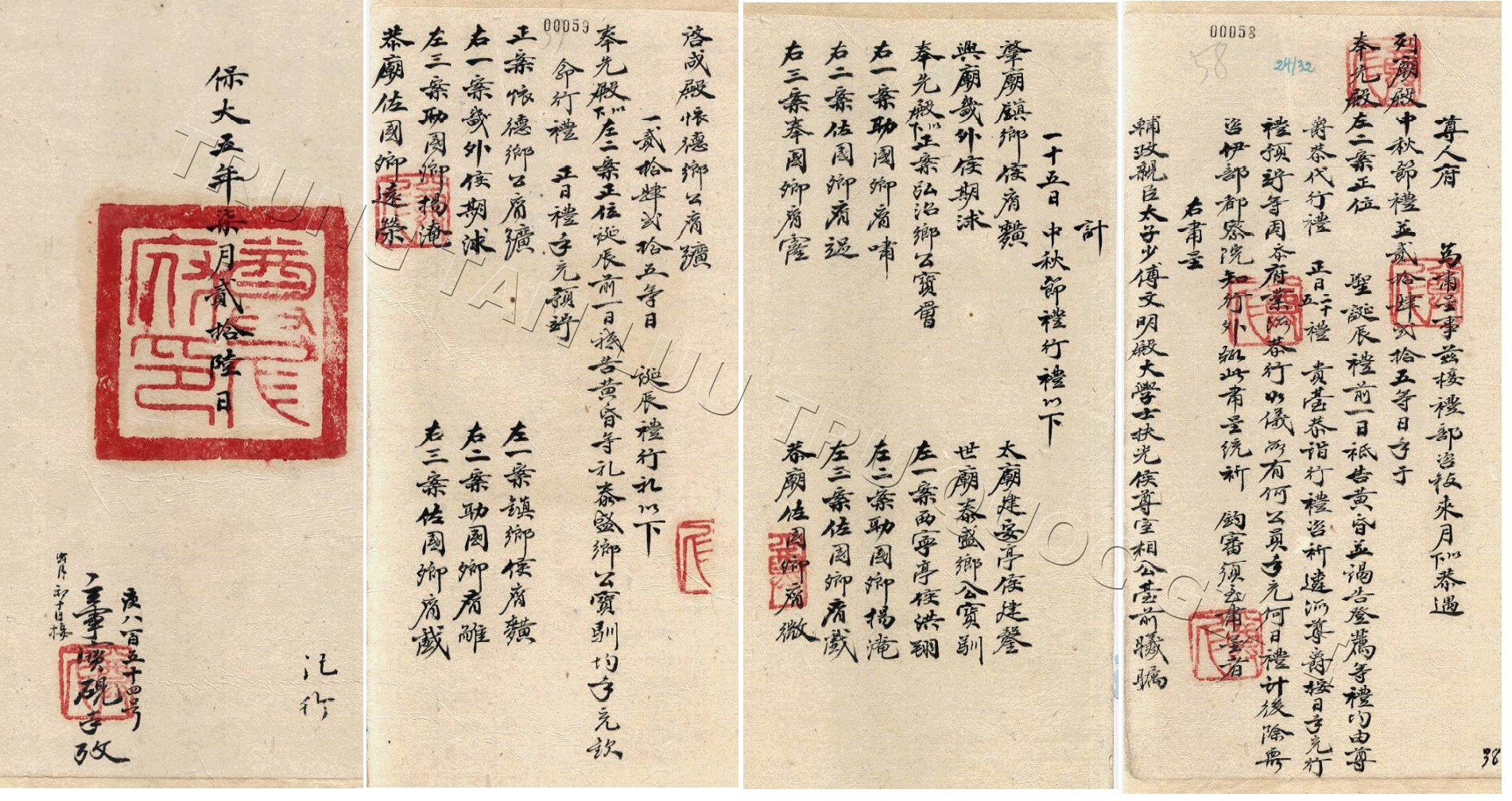
A Bảo Đại period document issued by the Imperial Clan Court which mentions the Tết Trung Thu

Tết Trung Thu originated from Chinese culture, with three main legends that are associated with the festival: the story of Chang'e and Hou Yi, Emperor Tang Ming Huang's ascent to the moon in China, and the story of Uncle Cuội of Vietnam.

The Chinese have celebrated the harvest during the autumn full moon since the Shang dynasty (c. 1600–1046 BCE). The term mid-autumn (中秋) first appeared in Rites of Zhou, a written collection of rituals from the Western Zhou dynasty (1046–771 BCE). The celebration as a festival only started to gain popularity during the early Tang dynasty (618–907 CE). One legend explains that Emperor Xuanzong of Tang started to hold formal celebrations in his palace after exploring the Moon Palace.

According to Phan Kế Bính in the book of Việt Nam phong tục, the custom of hanging lights to display the feast was due to the ancient scriptures about Emperor Tang Ming Huang. On the emperor's birthday, he would order people to hang lights everywhere and arrange a party to celebrate, and it has since become a custom.

The tradition of lantern processions dates back to the Song dynasty, due to a story that during the reign of Emperor Song Renzong in China, a carp transformed into a monster, and every night the Moon appeared to turn into a girl to harm people. In response, Bao Gong, a new official ordered the folk to make a fish lamp like the carp's image and bring it out to play in the street. This aimed to scare the monster so that it would not dare harm the people.

Phan Kế Bính also stated that the custom of trống quân singing dates back to the reign of Emperor Quang Trung – Nguyễn Huệ, "when he brought troops to the North. Many soldiers were homesick." To lift up their spirits and alleviate their homesickness, Nguyễn Huệ presented a way for both sides to pretend to be boys and girls, singing and responding to each other. This was accompanied by a drum beat, hence the name trống quân (military drum).

== Activities and customs ==
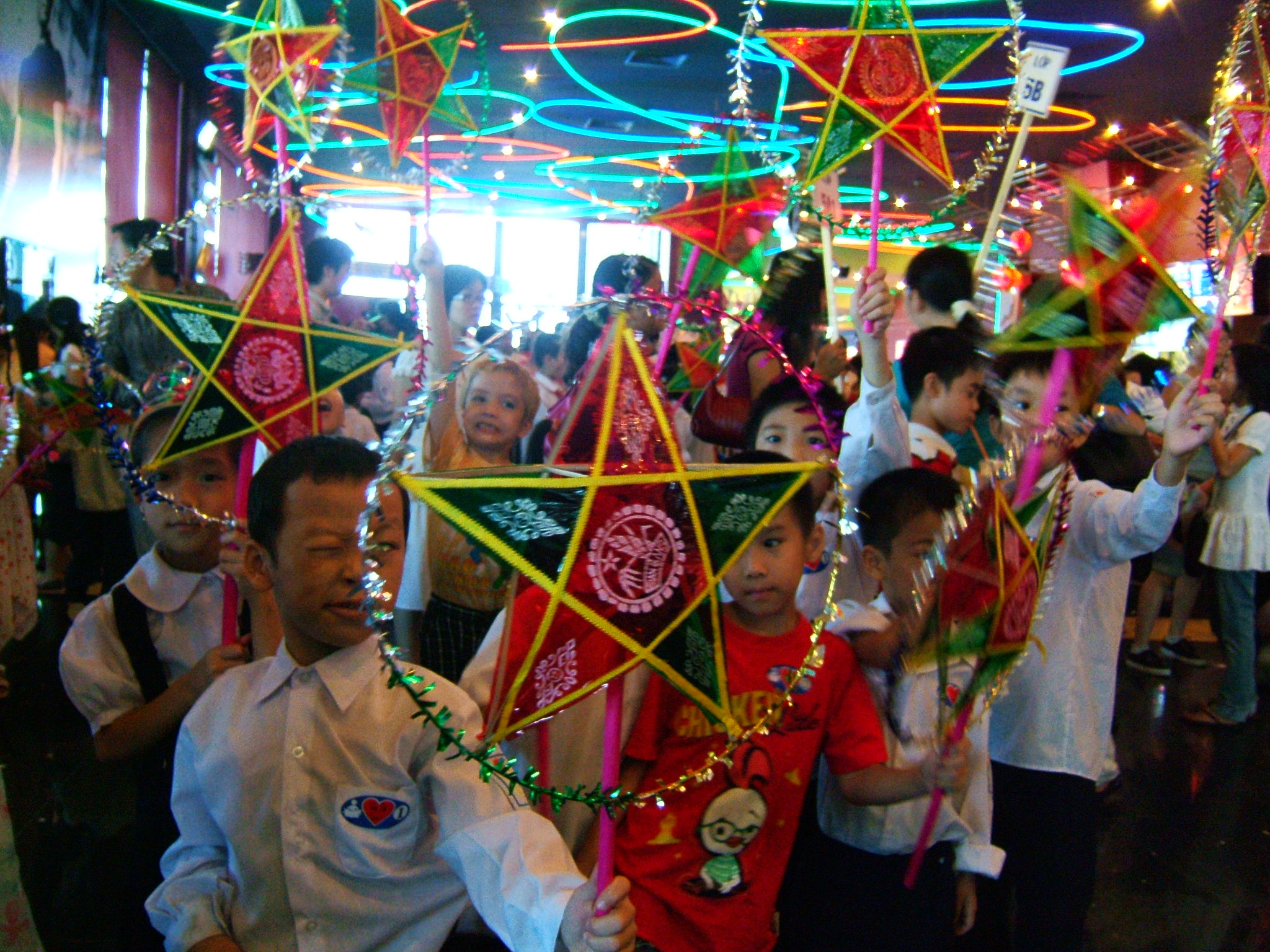
Vietnamese children carry the star lantern during Tết Trung Thu

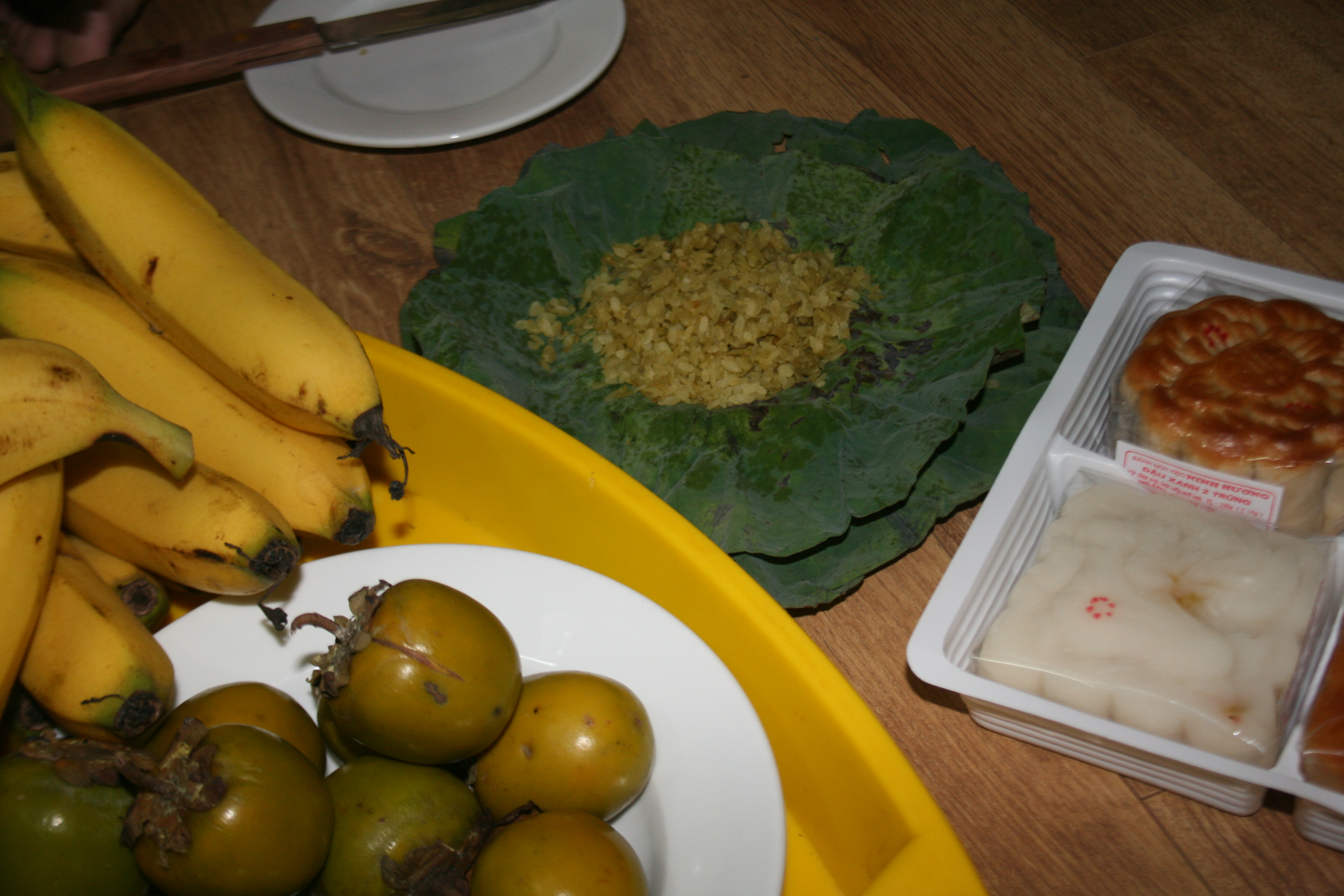
A tray for children during the Tết Trung Thu in Hanoi

Children's toys in Tết Trung Thu are made of paper and shaped like creatures such as butterflies, mantises, elephants, horses, unicorns, lions, dragons, deer, shrimps, and fish. During the evenings of the festival, children play tug and catch, and have a procession of lanterns, lions, drums, and Thanh la, a percussion instrument.

In the evening when the full moon has just risen, people buy moon cakes, tea, and wine to worship their ancestors. Also on this day, people often give mooncakes, fruits, tea and wine to their grandparents, parents, teachers, friends, relatives and other benefactors. The Chinese often organize dragon dances during Tết Trung Thu, while the Vietnamese do lion dances. The lion symbolizes luck and prosperity and is a good omen for all families. In the past, Vietnamese people also held trống quân singing and hung lanterns in kéo quân during the festival. The drums are sung to the rhythm of three "thình, thùng, thình".

According to Vietnamese customs, during Tết Trung Thu, adults arrange parties for children to celebrate and buy or make various candle-lit lanterns to hang in the house and let the children participate in lantern processions. Tết Trung Thu celebrations often includes moon cakes, candies, sugar cane, grapefruit and other fruits.

=== Lantern procession ===
In some rural areas, where neighbors have closer relationships, people often organize so children can carry lanterns together through villages, hamlets and neighborhoods on the Tết Trung Thu night. Lantern festivals can be initiated by the local government or by youth groups in the village. Participants compete to have the largest or prettiest lanterns in the procession. In Phan Thiết (Bình Thuận), a large-scale lantern procession was held with thousands of elementary and junior high school students marching through the streets. This festival was set as the largest record in Vietnam. It is a traditional mid-autumn lantern procession festival dating back hundreds of years, and the scale of the festival in Phan Thiết increases every year, but also becomes more "commercial". In Tuyên Quang, there is also a large lantern procession festival, fully mobilized from the creativity of the people, from village to village, which has not been commercialized.

=== Lion dance ===
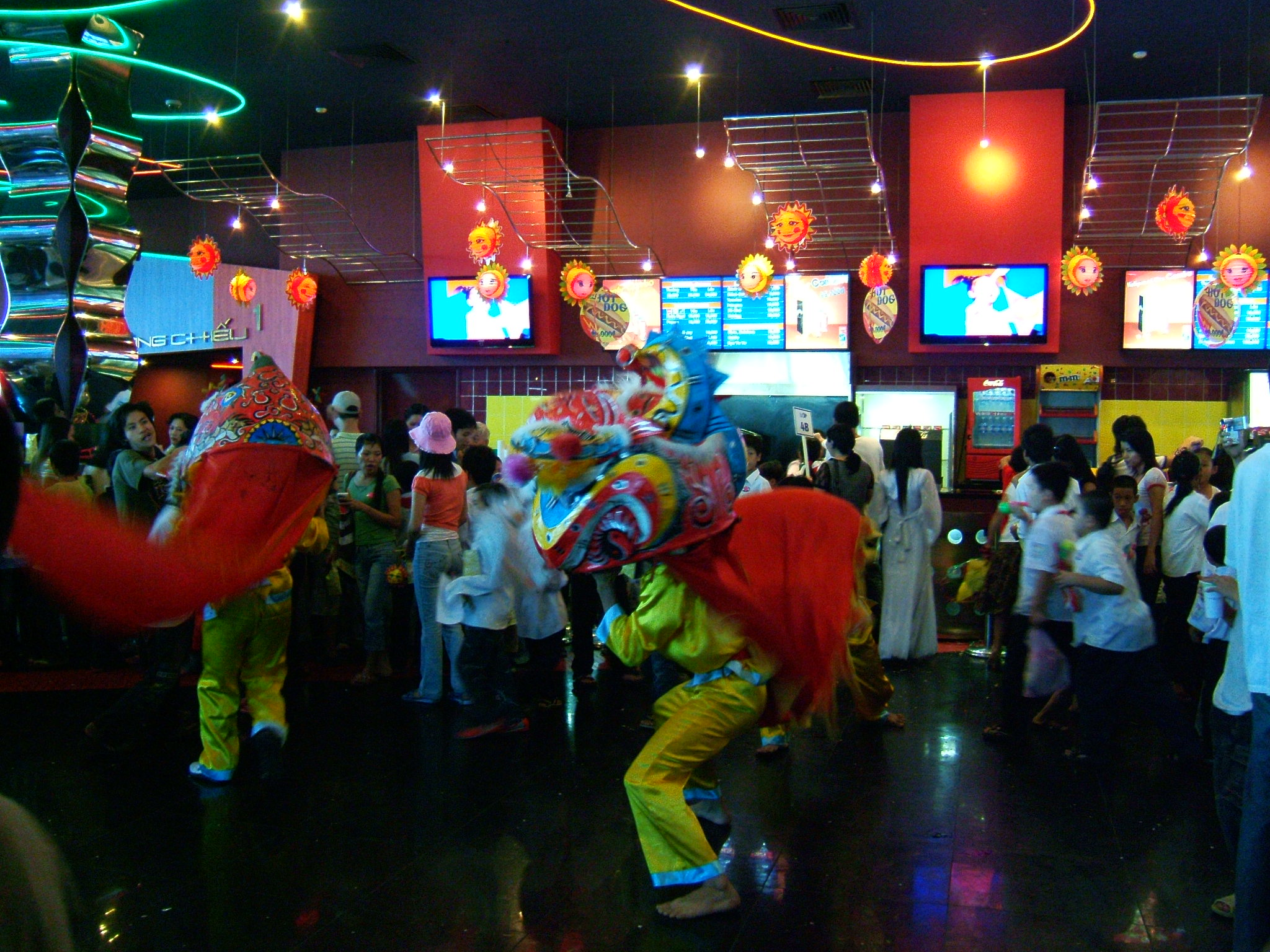
Lion dance during Tết Trung Thu

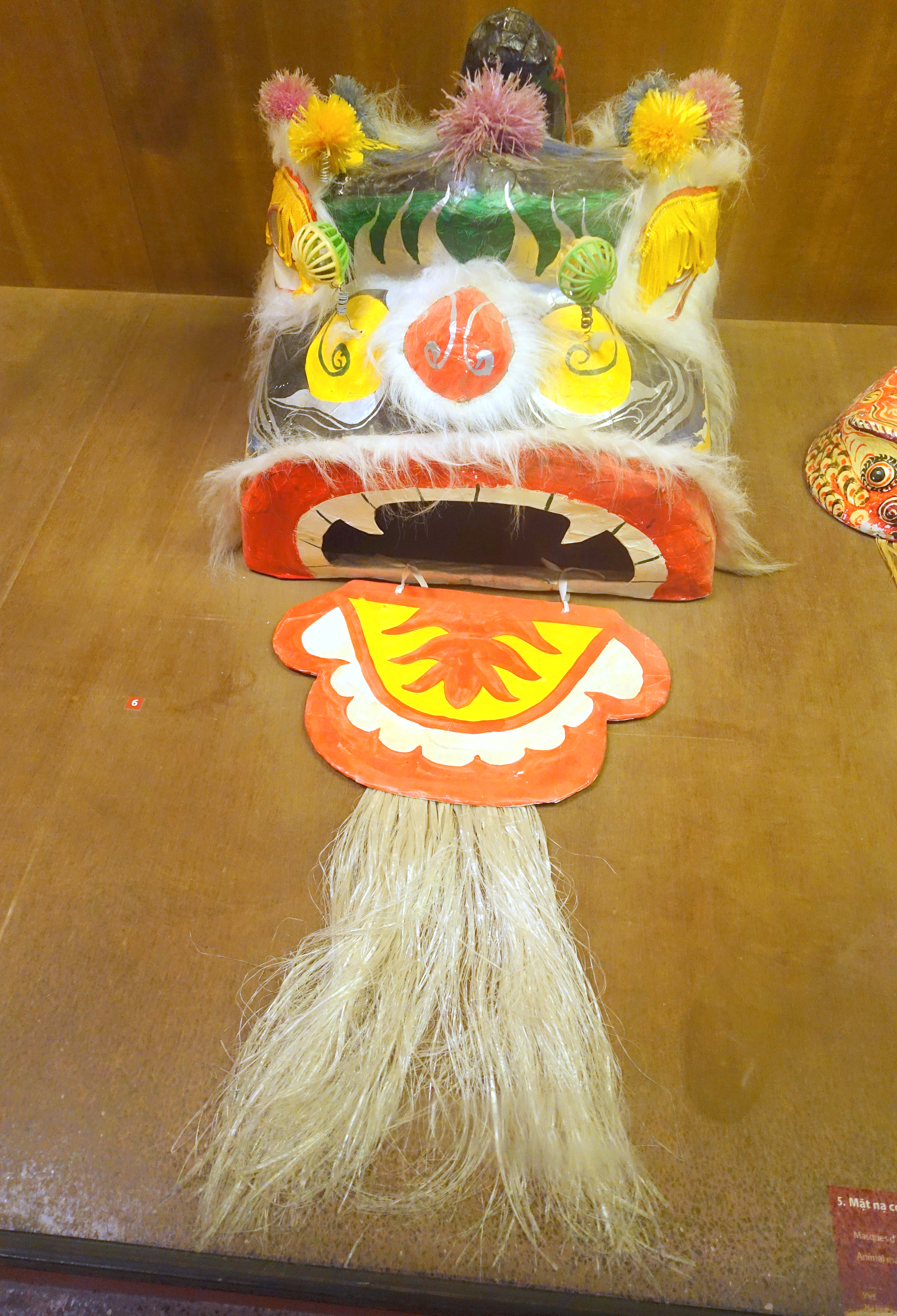
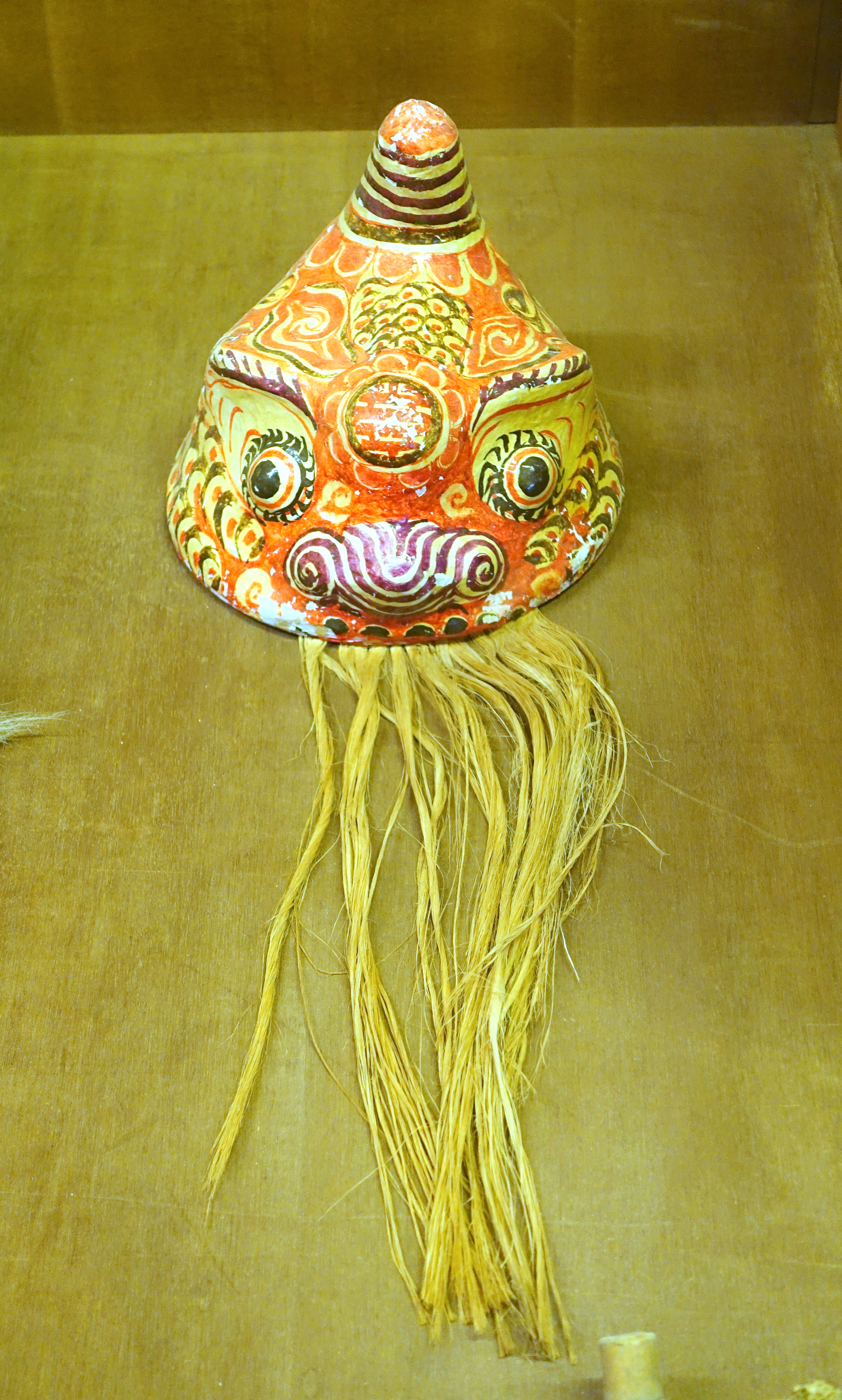
Lion heads made of cardboard are used by children during the Tết Trung Thu

Lion dance is usually held before the Tết Trung Thu, with the most busiest nights being the fourteenth and fifteenth nights.

=== Party ===
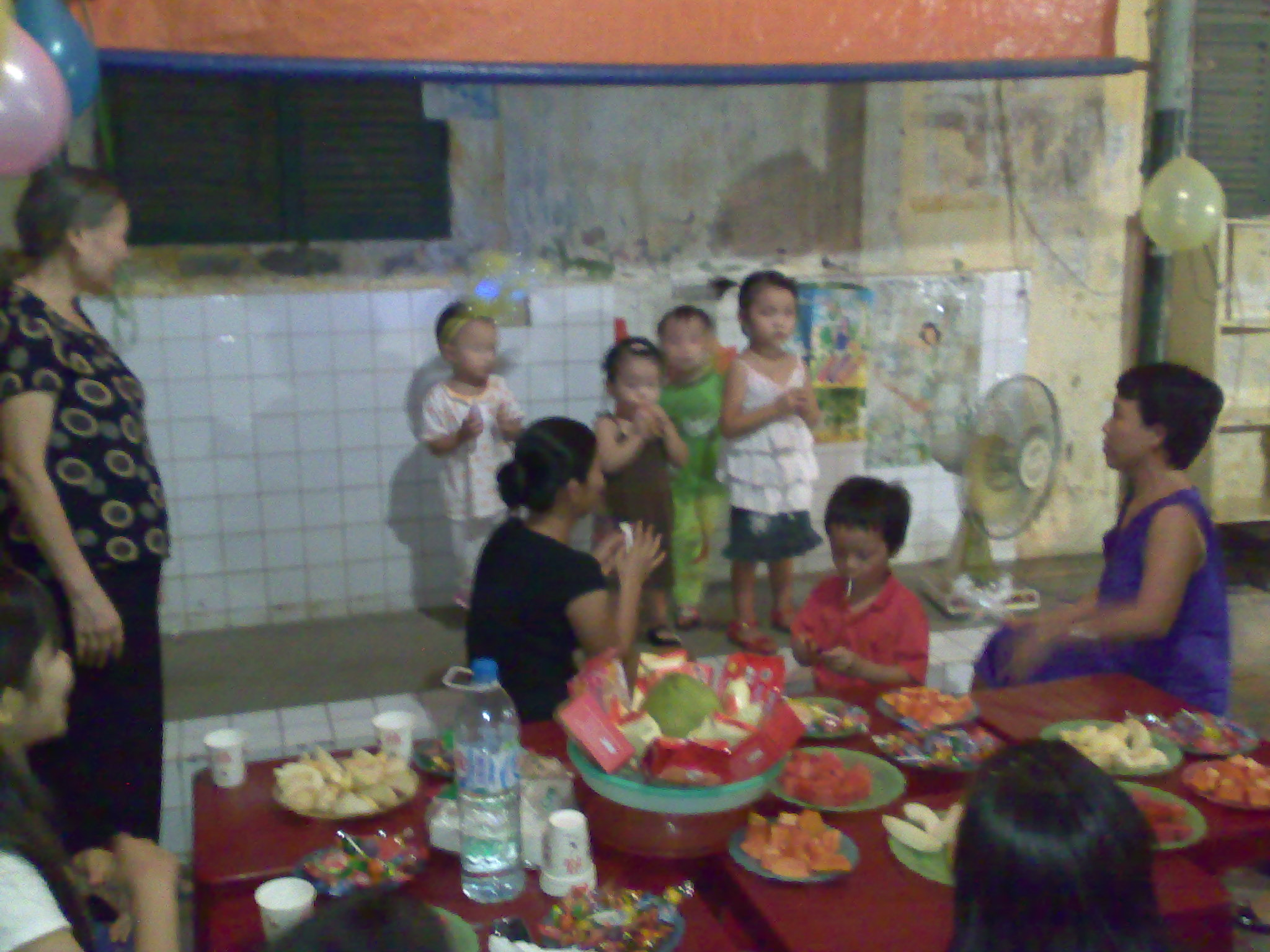
Children in Hanoi are having a party to watch the moon

Tết Trung Thu at Ho Chi Minh City Cancer Center with volunteers and sick children

Typically, the focus of Tết Trung Thu celebratory food is a dog is made of grapefruit cloves, with two black beans attached as eyes. Surrounding the dog, there are fruits and cakes, like bánh nướng (baked mooncakes), bánh dẻo (sticky rice mooncakes) or vegetarian cakes, which are usually in the shape of a mother pig with a herd of chubby piglets, or carp. Grapefruit seeds are usually peeled and skewered on steel wires, dried for 2–3 weeks before the full moon, and on the Tết Trung Thu night, the strings of grapefruit seeds are displayed. The typical fruit and food elements of this occasion are bananas, nuggets, apricots, red and blue pickled persimmons, daisies, and grapefruit. The feast begins when the moon reaches the zenith.

The custom of looking at the Moon is associated with the legend of Uncle Cuội, who found his precious banyan tree uprooted and flying into the sky one day. Clinging to the tree roots, he flew to the Moon with the tree. Looking up at the Moon, one can see a clear black spot in the shape of an old tree with people sitting under it, and children believe that it is a picture of Uncle Cuội sitting at the base of a banyan tree.

=== Toys ===
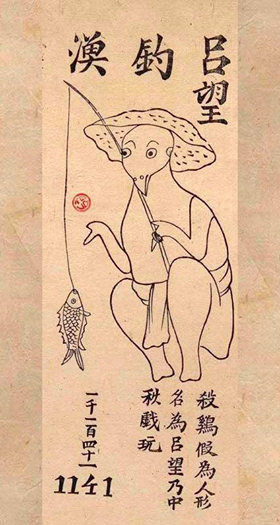
Lã Vọng fishing, Tết Trung Thu toy of ancient Vietnam

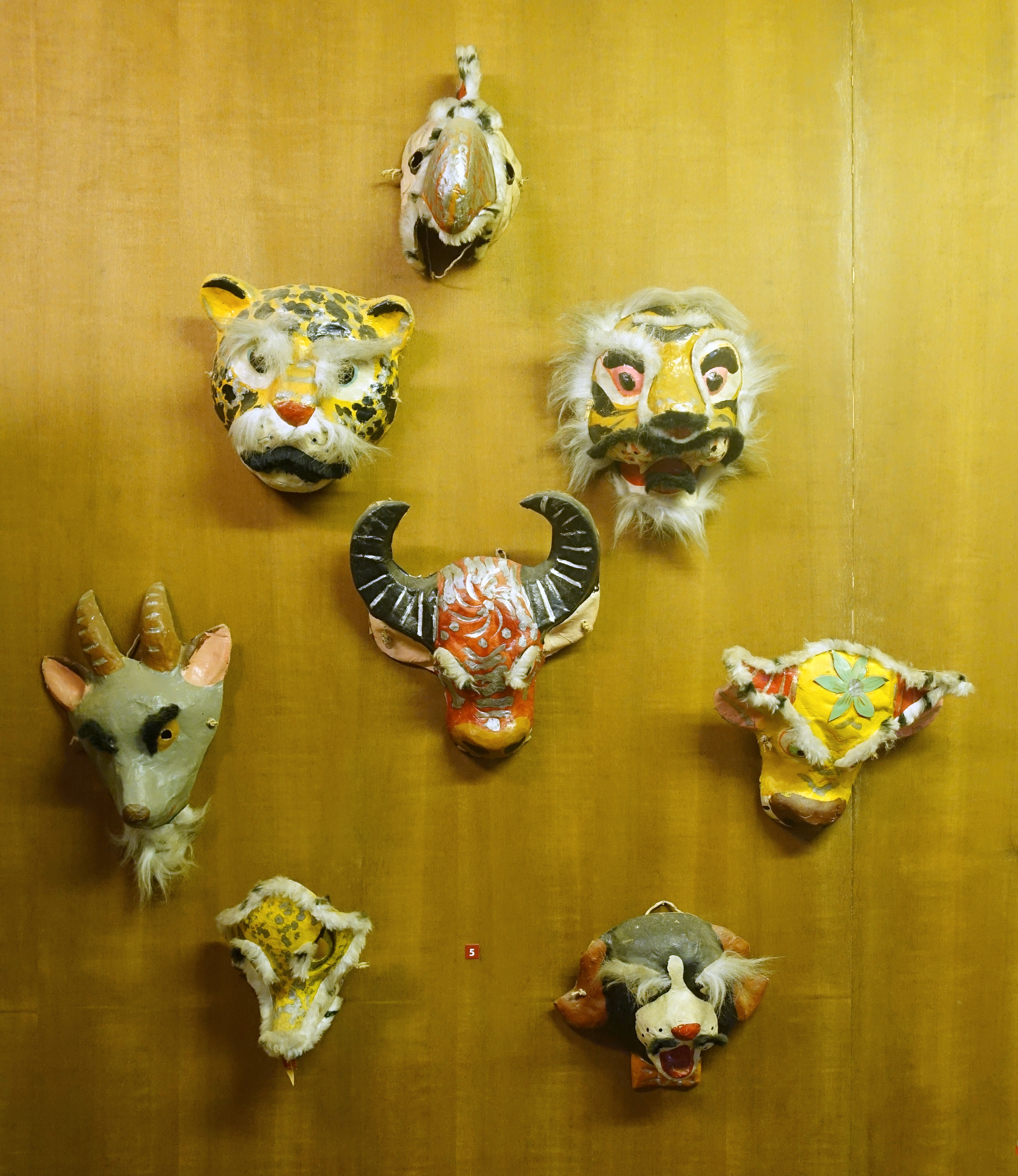
Children's masks during the Tết Trung Thu

Masks, lion lights, star lights and lion heads are the most popular toys during the festival. Previously in the North, during the Bao cấp period (1976–1986), toys for children during the Tết Trung Thu were very rare. Families often made their own toys such as bỏi drums, lanterns, monk lamps, star lamps, kéo quân lamps, masks, tò he, toy ship models, and pinwheels for children in the family. Masks are usually made of paperboard or cardboard, featuring children's favorite characters at that time, including lion heads, Ông Địa, Sun Wukong, Zhu Bajie, or Baigujing. Today, most toys in Vietnam come from China, and the masks are often made of thin plastic.

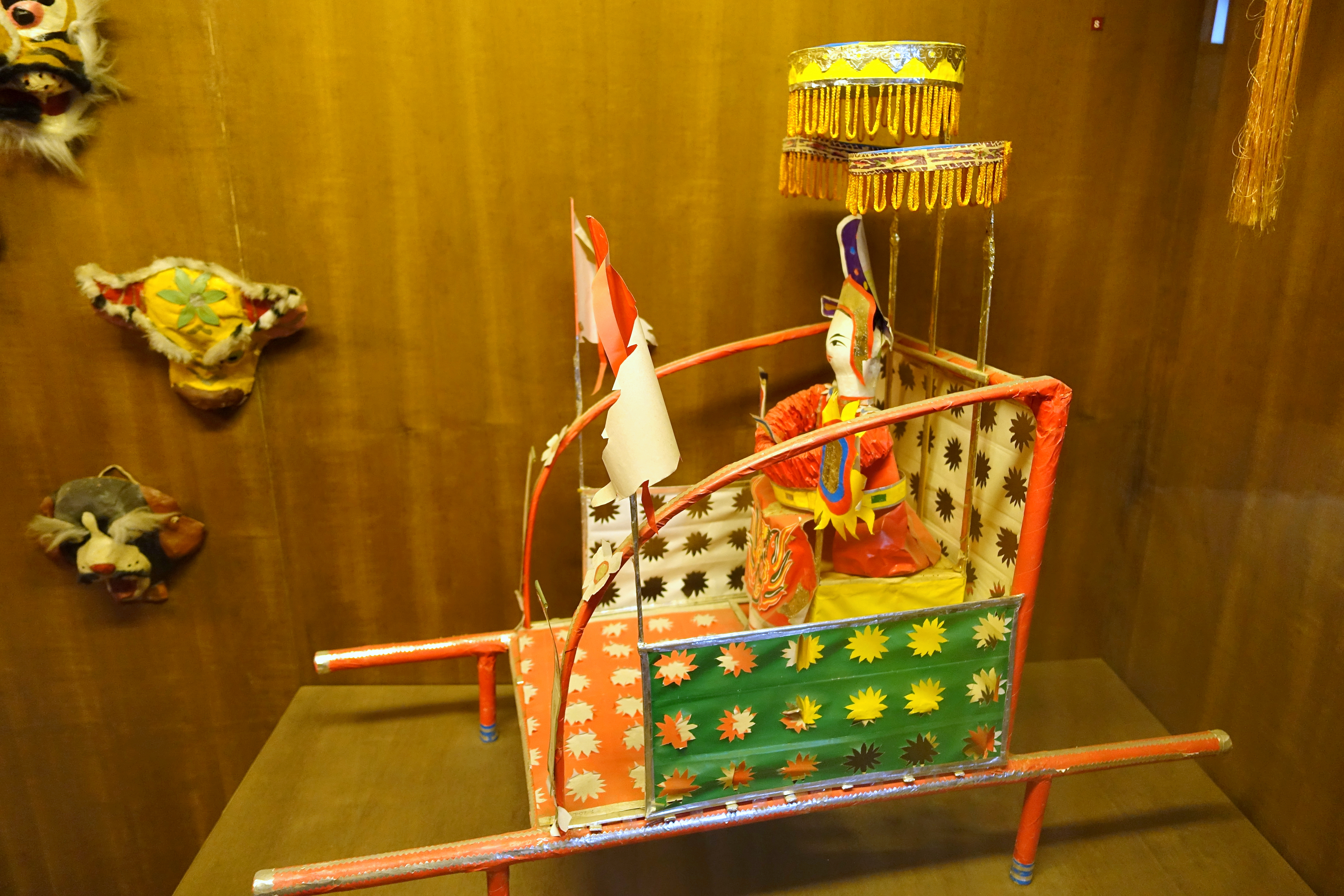
Tiến sĩ giấy – a popular children's toy during the Tết Trung Thu in the Nguyễn dynasty

==== Lanterns ====
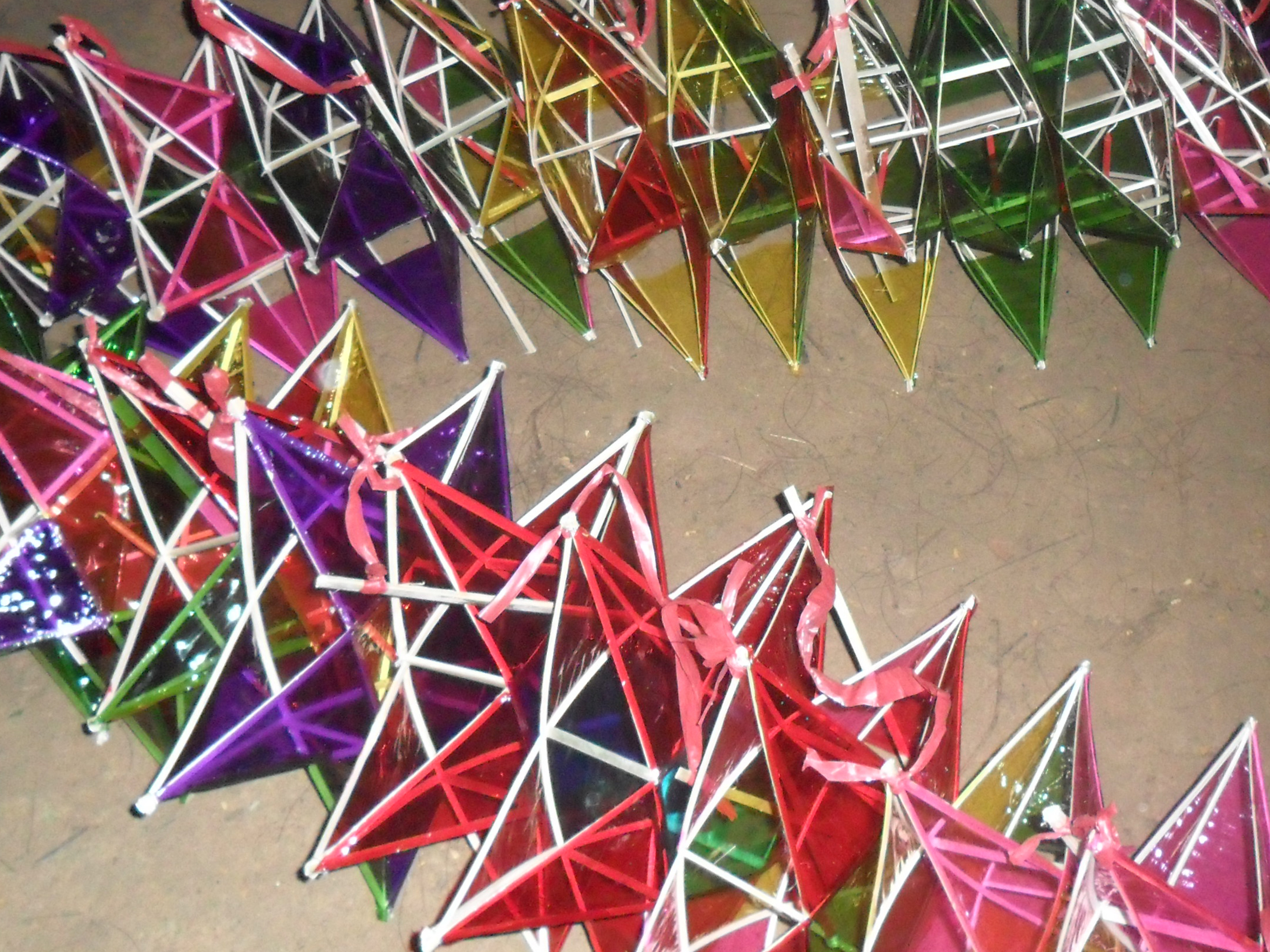
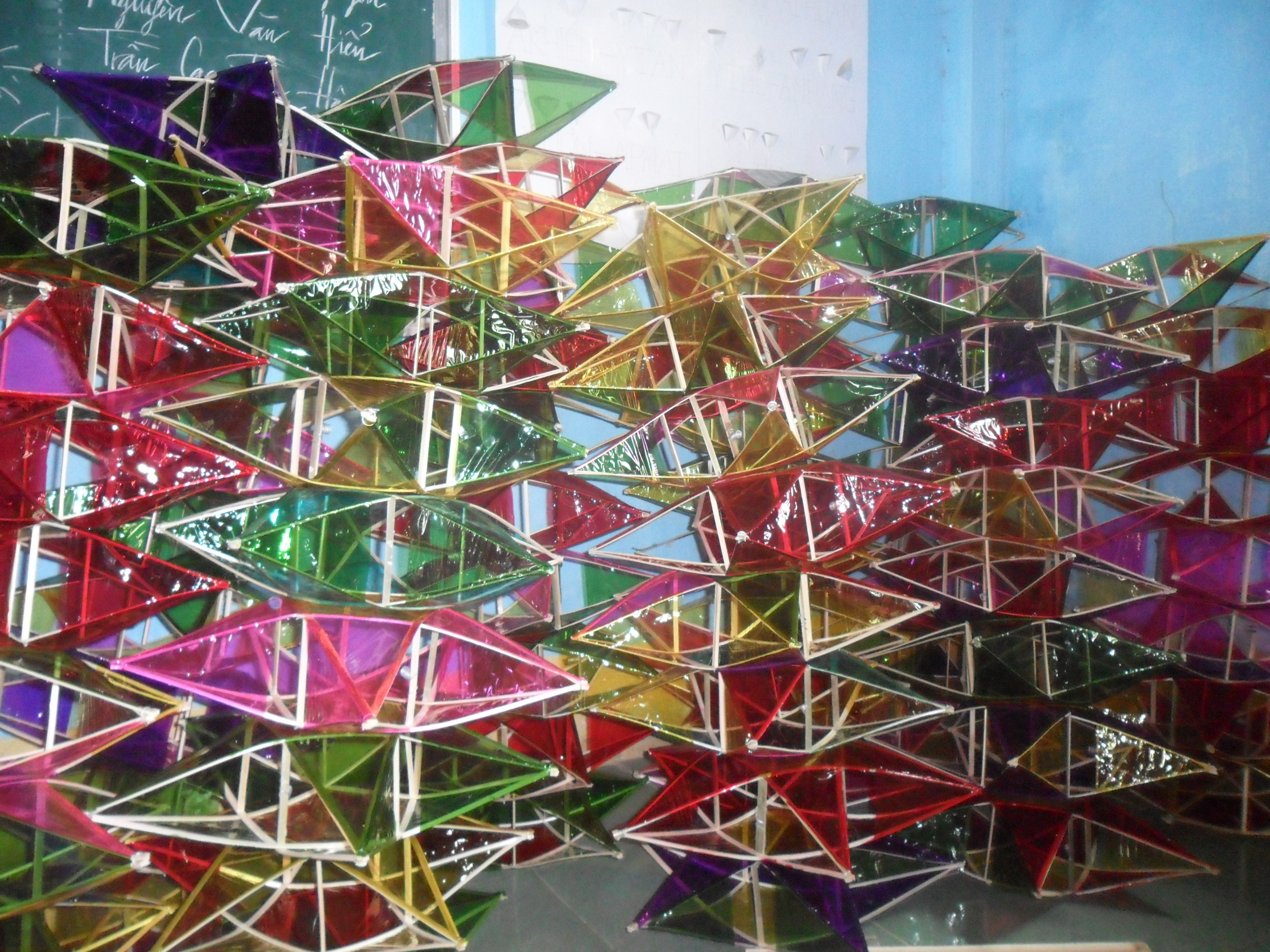
Lantern production in Kon Tum

In the Southern of Vietnam, the two cities of Hội An and Saigon are famous throughout the country for the craft of making decorative lanterns and paper lanterns used during Tết Trung Thu. According to Văn Công Lý, the lantern making industry in Hội An traces back to an ancestor called Xã Đường. The uniqueness of Hội An lanterns lies in their diverse shapes, designs, and sizes. Lanterns can be covered with Hà Đông silk rather than paper to make the light more magical and shimmering.

In Saigon, the largest center for the production of Trung Thu lanterns in South Vietnam has been Phú Bình in District 11 since before 1975, supplying the whole region's lanterns. This originated with a migrant community in 1954, originally from Báo Đáp village in Nam Định province. The Northern village is famous for its dyeing industry. When coming to the South, people still continued dyeing, weaving and making shoes. After 1975, Phú Bình, situated in the Phú Trung ward of Tân Phú district and Ward 5 of District 11 in Ho Chi Minh City, is approximately half a kilometer away from the Đầm Sen tourist area. At first, when settling in the South, Phú Bình only specialized in producing simple Tết Trung Thu lanterns, such as flute lanterns, fish lanterns, and star lanterns, for students to have fun on the holiday night.

From 1960 to 1975, Phú Bình annually produced more than half a million mid-autumn lanterns, supplying all provinces from Bến Hải to Cà Mau. After 1975, the people in the area reverted to their old jobs. In 1994, the Vietnamese market experienced a significant influx of Chinese lanterns, which impacted the demand for Phú Bình's traditional lanterns. The Chinese lanterns appealed to consumers with new styles, convenience in the wind, and cheaper price. Consequently, the popularity of Chinese lanterns adversely affected the livelihoods of Phú Bình residents, leading to economic difficulties and hardship.

In the Vietnamese market, the technology industry dedicated to produce toys for children on the occasion of the Tết Trung Thu has created jobs and profits for many small and medium enterprises. This is due to the use of common materials, simple technology, and little capital. After a period of Chinese toys dominating the market, Vietnamese lantern production recovered in 2006 and started to reoccupy the domestic market.

=== Mooncakes ===
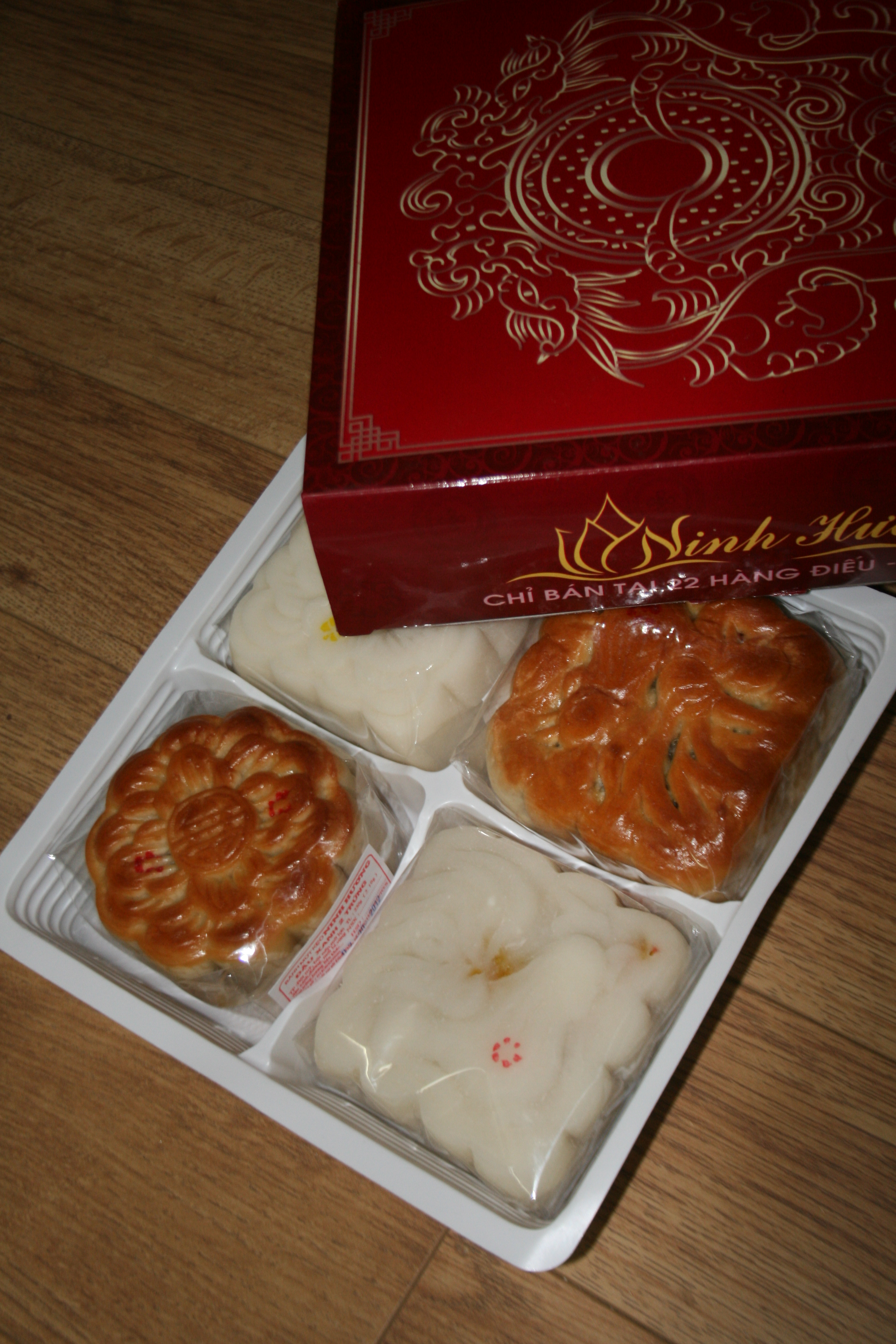
Box of bánh nướng and bánh dẻo

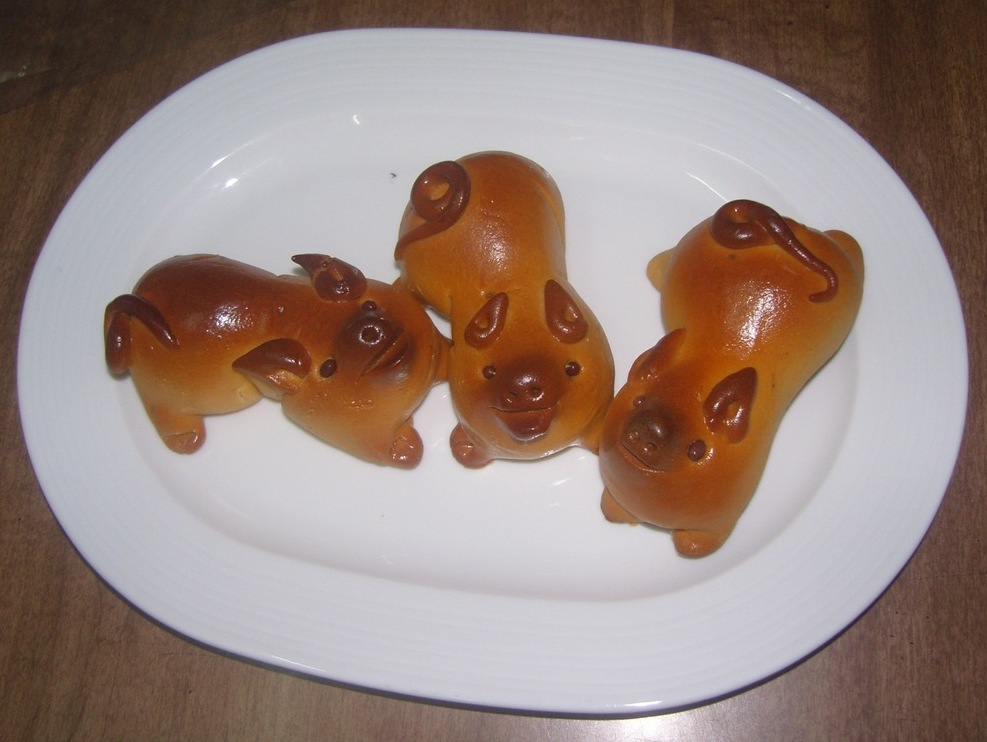
Pig shaped bánh nướng

From traditional to modern variations, moon cakes have become increasingly diverse as manufacturers get creative in using different ingredients and foods into the filling, stamping cakes into various designs, and designing creative packaging for them. However, based on the recipe for making the crust, there are two main types of bánh trung thu (lit. 'mid-autumn cake'): bánh nướng (baked cakes) and bánh dẻo (sticky rice cakes).

==== Bánh nướng ====
Bánh nướng are made with a crust of flour and a little oil. Sugar to mix into the crust is usually cooked with malt for the amber color and so they can be preserved for as long as possible (usually after the Tết Trung Thu, bakers cook sugar water and store it until the next season to use). In the past, in Vietnam, the filling for mooncakes was usually mixed, with a little bit of lime leaves, fatty meat, jam, melon seeds, and sausages.

After shaping the cakes by pressing a mold with the desired designs, the cakes are put in the oven. The baking process is divided into two stages of which about two-thirds of the baking time is the first stage. After that, the cakes are unloaded, cooled, covered with egg yolk and then baked for the remaining third of the time.

==== Bánh dẻo ====
Traditionally, sticky rice mooncakes are made with a shell of roasted and finely ground glutinous rice flour, boiled and cooled white sugar water (in contrast with baked mooncakes, malt is not used), and juice from pomelo flowers. The filling is made from various cooked foods and ingredients. The cake is molded and pressed, and can be eaten immediately without needing to be baked in an oven.

=== Singing Trống quân ===
Tết Trung Thu in the North also has the custom of singing trống quân. The male and female sides sing and respond to each other, while beating on a barbed wire or steel wire stretched on an empty barrel, popping out "thình thùng thình" sounds as the rhythm for the song. Songs are used to sing along with the rhyme are sometimes improvised. The confrontation in the drum singing sessions is fun and sometimes difficult because of the puzzles.

=== Gift-giving ===
During Tết Trung Thu, people often give gifts to each other, usually boxes of cakes, lanterns, clothes, money. Agencies and businesses also give gifts to customers and employees, sometimes even buying mooncake trucks. Many companies have thousands of workers and thus order thousands of boxes of mooncakes with generous commissions calculated on the total amount of mooncakes consumed. In 2006, an estimated 6,500–6,800 tons of mooncakes were consumed, with consumers having spent more than 800 billion VND for about 7 million boxes. Boxes of mooncakes were expensive, making them unaffordable for the poor.

Adults typically give gifts to individuals who are considered their superiors (such as their parents and work superiors), people in need, teachers, neighbors, friends, and children within their household. The value of the gift often corresponds to the importance of the recipient, meaning that gifts for individuals with higher positions or relationships may be of higher value. The act of giving Tết Trung Thu gifts has become a common practice as living conditions improve, especially after the Đổi Mới reform period in Vietnam.

For businesses or individuals, not giving Tết Trung Thu gifts can be seen as negligent or shameful, making it a significant expense. The cost of giving gifts is usually spent from the cash received from guests. Many people prefer to use agency funds to take advantage of high commission and discounts offered by bakeries, potentially up to 35%.

Giving expensive Tết Trung Thu gifts is considered a "graceful" gesture for adults. Many people use this occasion as an opportunity to exchange gifts with officials. Elaborate boxes of moon cakes with "gold" and "dollar" filling are often given to officials, and gift-giving during the Tết Trung Thu has become a customary practice.

=== Moon viewing ===
On the night of Tết Trung Thu, people often gather to watch the Moon as it is considered the prime time for Moon viewing.

== Tết Trung Thu in literature and art ==
=== Poetry about Tết Trung Thu ===
The poet Tản Đà mentioned the Tết Trung Thu with the following verses:

Có bầu có bạn can chi tủi
Cùng gió cùng mây thế mới vui
Rồi cứ mỗi năm rằm tháng tám
Tựa nhau trông xuống thế gian cười.

Poet Nguyễn Du also mentioned the festival in his poem "The Tale of Kiều":

Khi chén rượu khi cuộc cờ,
Khi xem hoa nở khi chờ trăng lên

=== Songs about Tết Trung Thu ===
“Chiếc Đèn Ông Sao” (translated as “The Star Lantern”) is a well known vietnamese song composed by Phạm Tuyên for Tết Trung Thu. The song is widely known for its lively melody and simple, memorable lyrics that appeal to young children.

“Rước Đèn Tháng Tám” (“Carrying Lanterns in the Eighth Month”) was composed by Đức Quỳnh. It has cheerful rhythms and joyful lyrics, the song captures the festive atmosphere of Tết Trung Thu.

Musician Lê Thương wrote a song Thằng Cuội. Musician Ngọc Lễ has a piece titled Cắc tùng cắc tùng about the Tết Trung Thu for children.

== See also ==
- List of harvest festivals
- Tết Nguyên Đán
- Tết Đoan Ngọ
- Tsukimi, the Japanese autumn harvest festival held on the same day
- Chuseok, the Korean autumn harvest festival held on the same day
- Mid-Autumn Festival, the Chinese Moon-observance festival held on the same day
