= Bayue =

Eighth month of the Chinese calendar

Bāyuè

Chinese name
- Chinese: 八月
- Hanyu Pinyin: Bāyuè
Transcriptions
Standard Mandarin
- Hanyu Pinyin: Bāyuè

Korean name
- Hangul: 팔월
- Hanja: 八月
Transcriptions
- Revised Romanization: Parwol

Traditional Korean name
- Hangul: 닭달
- Hanja: 酉月
Transcriptions
- Revised Romanization: Dakdal

Japanese name
- Kanji: 八月
- Kana: はちがつ
Transcriptions
- Romanization: Hachigatsu

Traditional Japanese name
- Kanji: 葉月
- Kana: はづき
Transcriptions
- Romanization: Hazuki

Bāyuè (Chinese: 八月) is the eighth month of the Chinese calendar and calendars based on it, such as the Japanese calendar, Korean calendar and Vietnamese calendar. It follows Qīyuè and precedes Jiǔyuè. It is known in Japanese as Hachigatsu (Japanese: 八月) or traditionally Hazuki (Japanese: 葉月), and in Korean as Parwol (Korean: 팔월; Hanja: 八月) or traditionally Dakdal (Korean: 닭달; Hanja: 酉月). All of these words can also refer to the month of August in the Gregorian calendar.

In the Tenpō calendar, the last official version of the Japanese calendar, the eighth month must always include the autumn equinox.

== Names ==
In Mandarin Chinese, traditional names of the month include guìyuè (Chinese: 桂月) and zhòngqiū (Chinese: 仲秋).

In Japanese, the month is known as hachigatsu (Japanese: 八月) or traditionally hazuki (Japanese: 葉月). The most common etymology is that it is a shortening of haochizuki (Japanese: 葉落月), meaning "month of falling leaves". Another explanation derives it from hoharizuki (穂張月), from 稲穂 (inaho, "ear of rice") + 張り (hari, "stretch; spread") + 月 (tsuki, "month").

== Observances ==
- The Mid-Autumn Festival is held on the 15th day of the 8th month.
- Chuseok is celebrated on the 15th day of the 8th month in Korea.
- The full moon on the 15th day of the 8th month is traditionally admired in Japan during autumn moon viewing.
- The Iwashimizu Festival was traditionally celebrated in Iwashimizu Hachimangū in Yawata, Kyoto on the 15th day of the 8th month.
- Sadashinō is celebrated on the 24th and 25th days of the 8th month in the Sada Shrine in Matsue, Shimane.
- Higan is celebrated twice a year, during the week centered around the spring equinox and the autumn equinox.

== Dates ==
Below is a list of the start and end dates of Bāyuè in the Gregorian calendar. Because the 1-hour difference between China and Japan/Korea occasionally affects the date on which a new moon occurs, the dates below can differ from those of the Japanese and Korean calendars.

Dates of Bāyuè
Year	First day	Last day
2016	1 September	30 September
2017	20 September	19 October
2018	10 September	8 October
2019	30 August	28 September
2020	17 September	16 October
2021	7 September	5 October
2022	27 August	25 September
2023	15 September	14 October
2024	3 September	2 October
2025	22 September	20 October
2026	11 September	9 October
2027	1 September	29 September
2028	19 September	17 October
2029	8 September	7 October
2030	29 August	26 September
2031	17 September	15 October
2032	5 September	3 October
2033	25 August	22 September
2034	13 September	11 October
2035	2 September	30 September
2036	20 September	18 October
