= Quan họ =

Vietnamese folk music

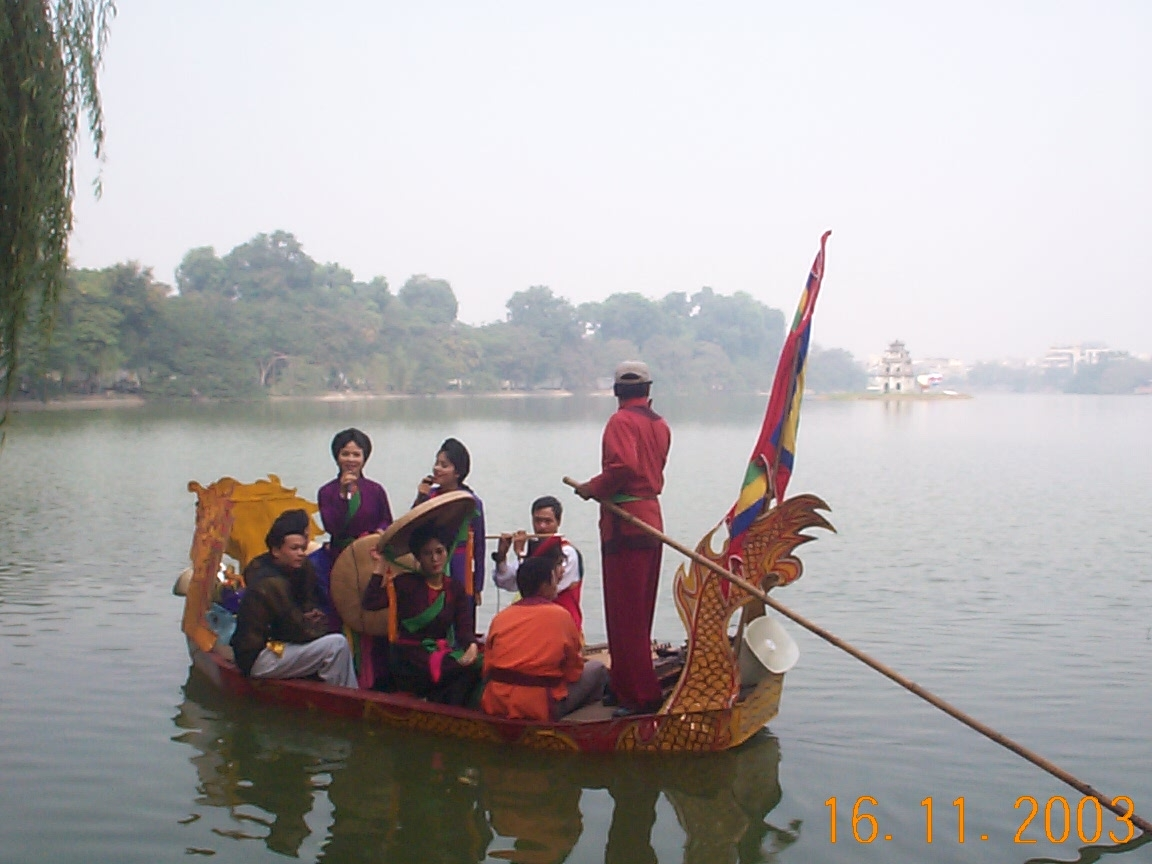
Singing Quan họ at Hoàn Kiếm Lake

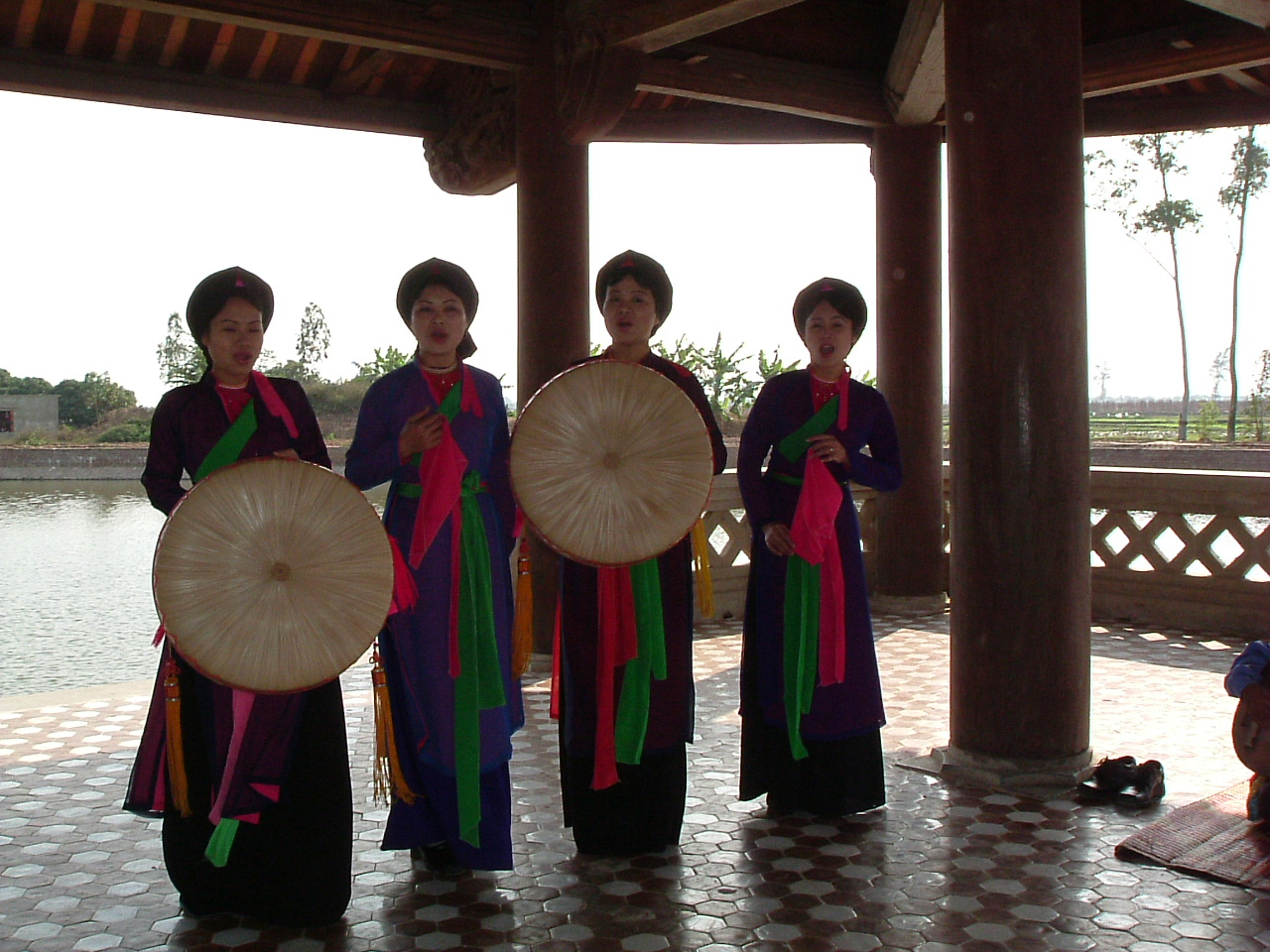
Women sing Quan họ at Đô Temple

Quan họ (Vietnamese: [kwaːn hɔ̂ˀ]) singing is a Vietnamese folk music style characterized both by its antiphonal nature, with alternating groups of female and male singers issuing musical challenges and responses. Quan họ is common in rituals and festivals, and a common theme in many songs is love and sentimentality as experienced by young adults. Quan họ was named as a UNESCO Intangible Cultural Heritage practice in 2009.

The quan họ style originated in what is now Bắc Ninh province and was first recorded in the 13th century, and has traditionally been associated with the spring festivals that follow the celebration of Tết Nguyên Đán (the Vietnamese New Year). Historically, the singing began on the evening before the festival, but today it is much more common for the singing to occur on the main day of the festival. In general, an initial "challenge phrase" (câu ra) from the known body of songs is sung by a pair of female singers, following which a pair of male singers will respond by selecting and singing a "matching phrase" (câu đối), which must repeat the melody of the challenge phrase. Once they are finished, the order is reversed, and the men will issue their own challenge phrase with a different melody. While in the past the singing was unaccompanied, it is common today for the singers to be accompanied by instruments, whether traditional Vietnamese instruments or modern ones such as electric keyboards.

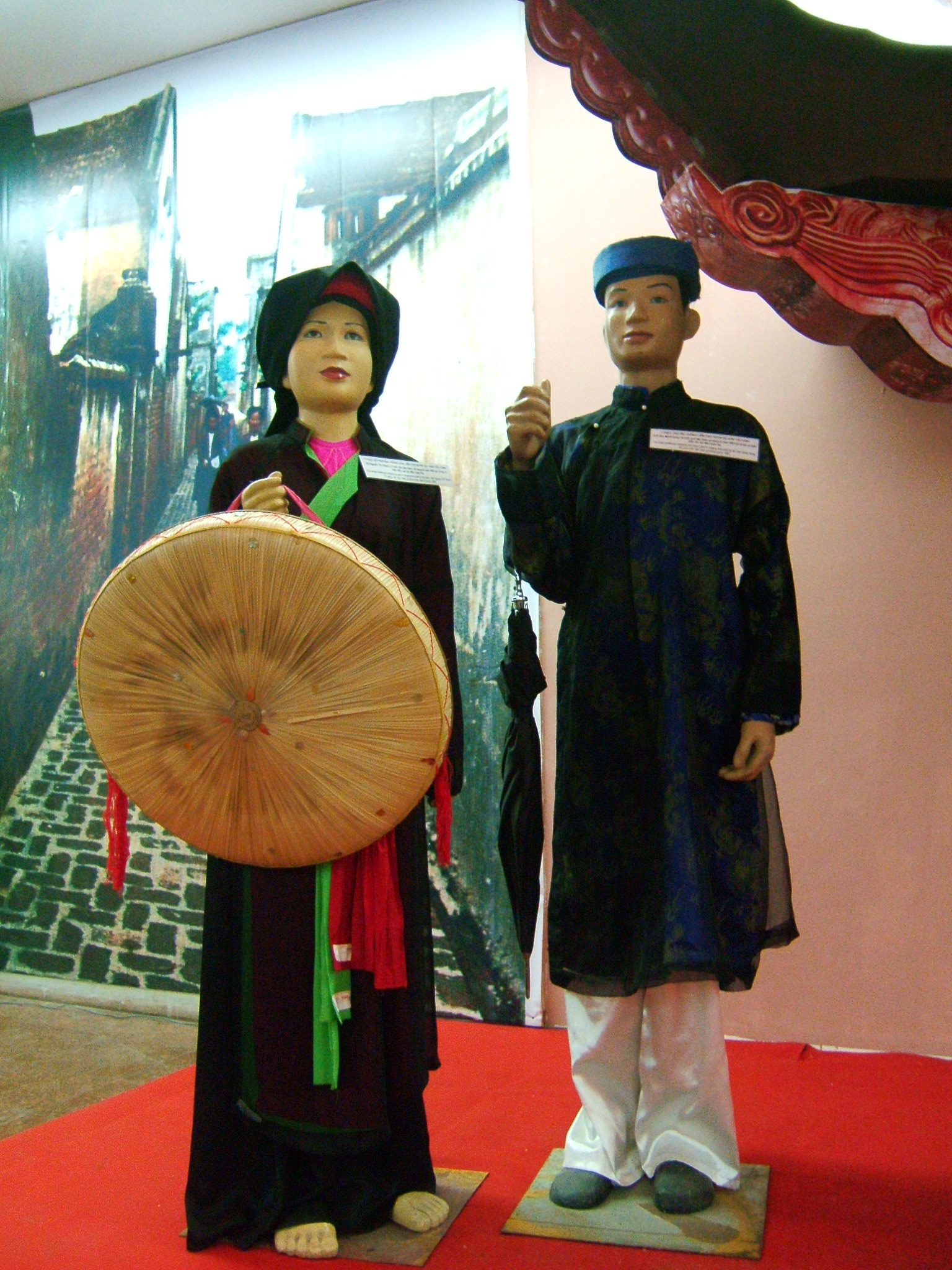
Men's and women's costumes in quan họ singing

There are a large number of quan họ melodies, with thousands of different songs having been recorded and written down in score form. A simpler variant of response song, allowing spoken responses and sung by boys and girls at village festivals is trống quân singing.
