= Tsukimi =

Japanese autumn festival

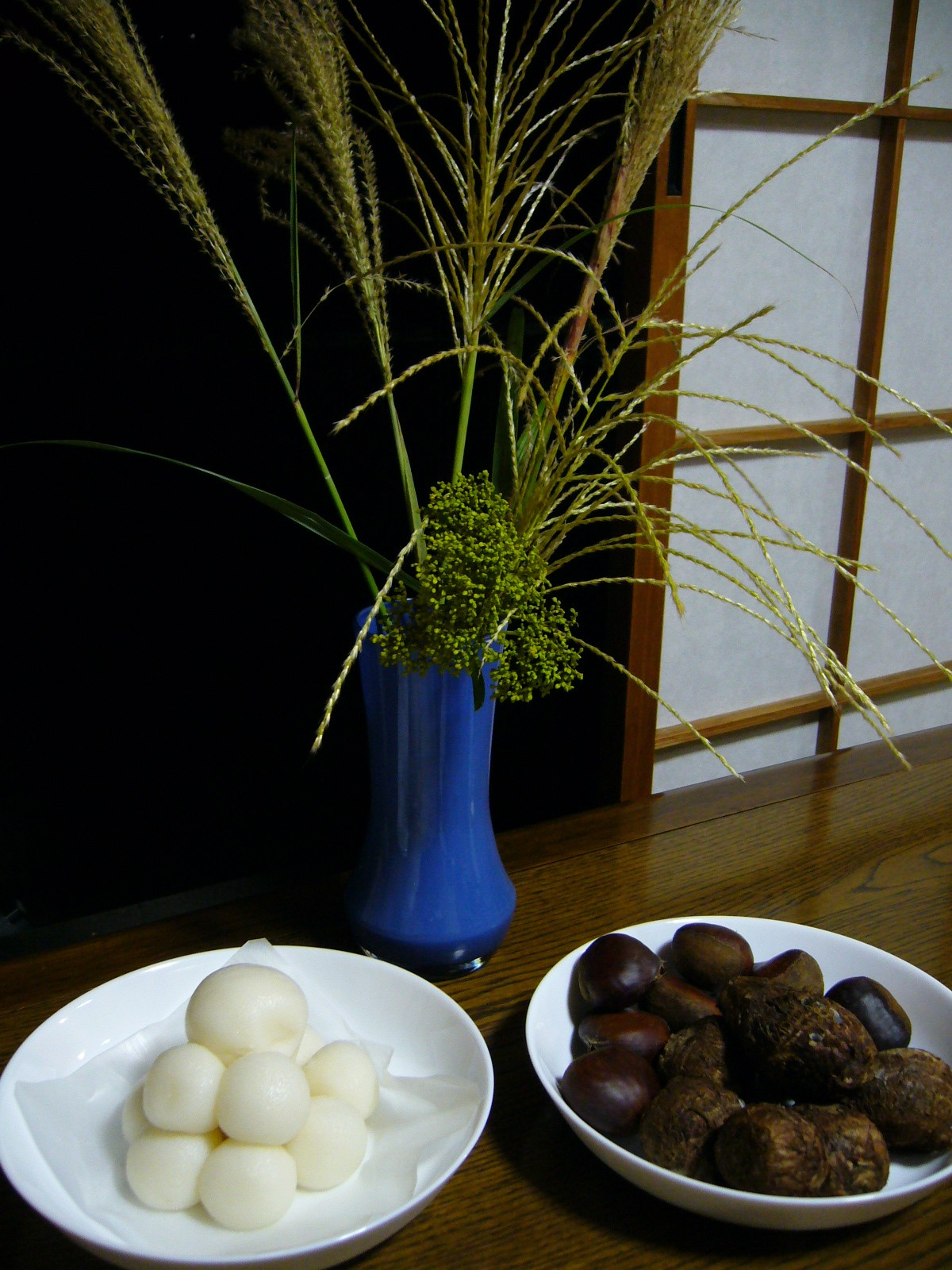
- Festival offerings: Tsukimi dango (left), susuki grass (middle) and chestnuts (right)
- Official name: Tsukimi (月見)
- Observed by: Japanese
- Type: Cultural, religious (Buddhist)
- Significance: Celebrates the harvest
- Observances: Burn incense at temples and consume dango
- Begins: 15th day of the 8th lunar month
- Ends: 18th day of the 8th lunar month
- Date: 13th day of the 9th lunar month
- 2025 date: 6 October – 9 October
- 2026 date: 25 September – 28 September
- 2027 date: 15 September – 18 September
- 2028 date: 3 October – 6 October
- Frequency: Annual
- Related to: Mid-Autumn Festival (in China); Chuseok (in Korea); Tết Trung Thu (in Vietnam); Uposatha of Ashvini/Krittika (similar festivals that generally occur on the same day in Cambodia, Sri Lanka, Myanmar, Laos, and Thailand)

Tsukimi (月見) or Otsukimi (お月見), meaning, "moon-viewing", are Japanese festivals honoring the autumn moon, a variant of the Mid-Autumn Festival. The celebration of the full moon typically takes place on the 15th day of the eighth month of the traditional Japanese calendar, known as Jūgoya (十五夜, fifteenth night); the waxing moon is celebrated on the 13th day of the ninth month, known as Jūsan'ya (十三夜, thirteenth night). These days normally fall in September and October of the modern solar calendar.

The tradition dates to the Heian era, and is now so popular in Japan that some people repeat the activities for several evenings following the appearance of the full moon during the eighth lunisolar month.

Tsukimi traditions include displaying decorations made from Japanese pampas grass (susuki) and eating rice dumplings called Tsukimi dango in order to celebrate the beauty of the Moon. Seasonal produce are also displayed as offerings to the Moon. Sweet potatoes are offered to the full moon, while beans or chestnuts are offered to the waxing moon the following month. The alternate names of the celebrations, Imomeigetsu (meaning "potato harvest moon") and Mamemeigetsu (meaning "bean harvest moon") or Kurimeigetsu (meaning "chestnut harvest moon") are derived from these offerings.

== History ==
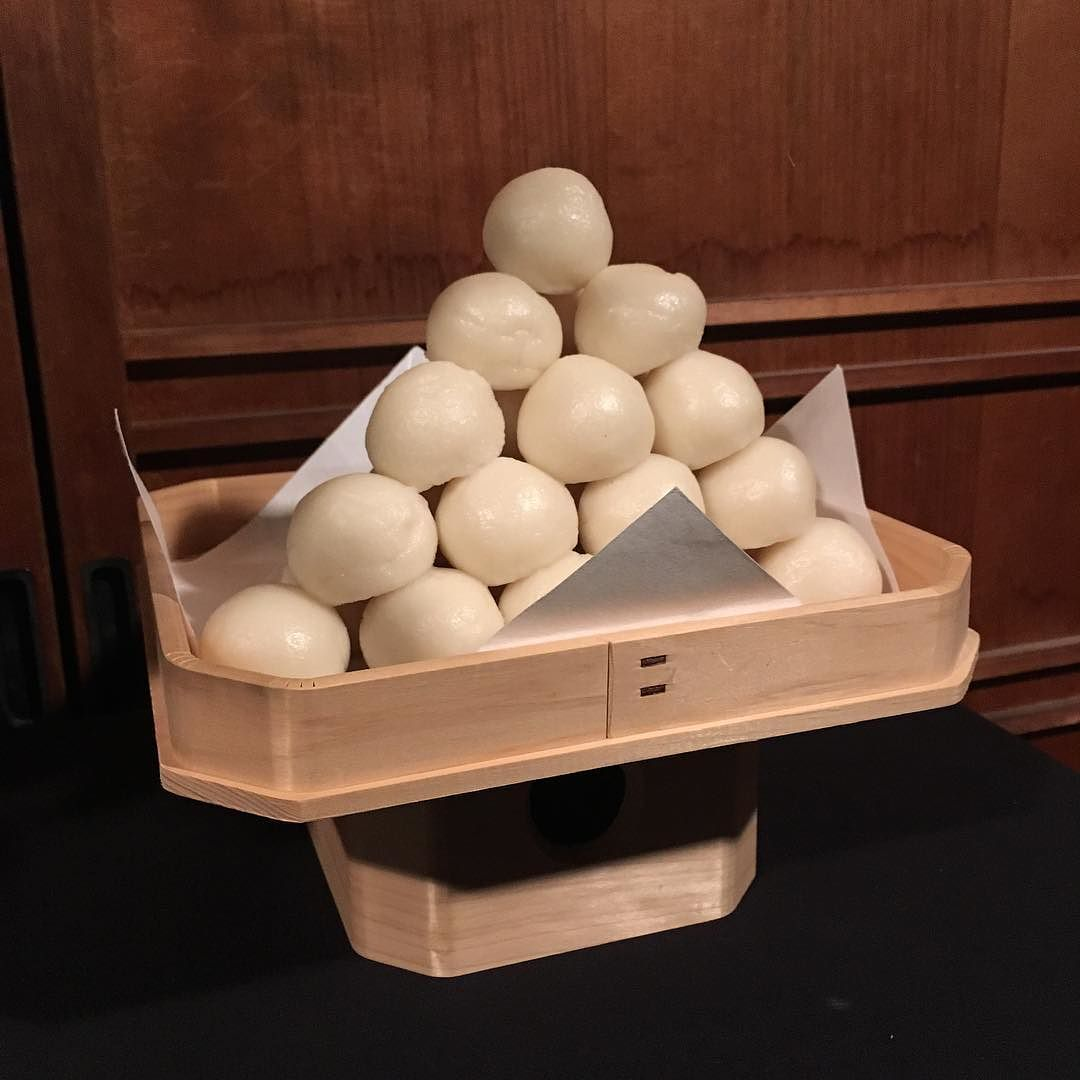
Tsukimi dango, rice dumplings eaten during the festival

Tsukimi refers to the Japanese tradition of holding parties to view the harvest moon. The custom is thought to have originated with Japanese aristocrats during the Heian period; influenced by the Chinese custom of Mid-Autumn Festival, they would gather to recite poetry under the full moon of the eighth month of the Japanese calendar, known as the "Mid-Autumn Moon" (中秋の名月, chūshū no meigetsu). On the evening of the full moon, it is traditional to gather in a place where the Moon can be seen clearly, decorate the scene with Japanese pampas grass, and to serve white rice dumplings (known as Tsukimi dango), taro, edamame, chestnuts and other seasonal foods, plus sake as offerings to the Moon in order to pray for an abundant harvest. These dishes are known collectively as Tsukimi dishes (月見料理, tsukimi ryōri). Due to the ubiquity of sweet potato or taro among these dishes, the tradition is known as Imomeigetsu (芋名月) or "Potato harvest moon."

From 862 until 1683, the Japanese calendar was arranged so that the full moon fell on the 13th day of each month. In 1684, however, the calendar was altered so that the new moon fell on the first day of each month, moving the full moon two days later, to the 15th day of the month. While some people in Edo (present-day Tokyo) shifted their Tsukimi activities to the 15th day of the month, others continued to observe the festival on the 13th day. Furthermore, there were various regional observances in some parts of Japan on the 17th day of the month, as well as Buddhist observances on the 23rd or the 26th day, all of which were used as pretexts for often late-night parties during the autumn throughout the Edo period. This custom was brought to a swift end during the Meiji period.

Festivals dedicated to the Moon have a long history in Japan. During the Heian period elements of the Chinese Mid-Autumn Festival were introduced to Japan. Members of the aristocratic class would hold moon-viewing events aboard boats in order to view the Moon's reflection on the surface of the water. The writing of waka poetry was also an element of such mid-autumn Moon viewing festivities.

There are specific terms in Japanese to refer to occasions when the Moon is not visible on the traditional mid-autumn evening, including Mugetsu (無月; "no-moon") and Ugetsu (雨月; "rain-moon"). Even when the Moon is not visible, however, Tsukimi parties are held. A Unicode emoji exists for Tsukimi (🎑), featuring pampas grass, dango and the Moon.

== Related foods ==
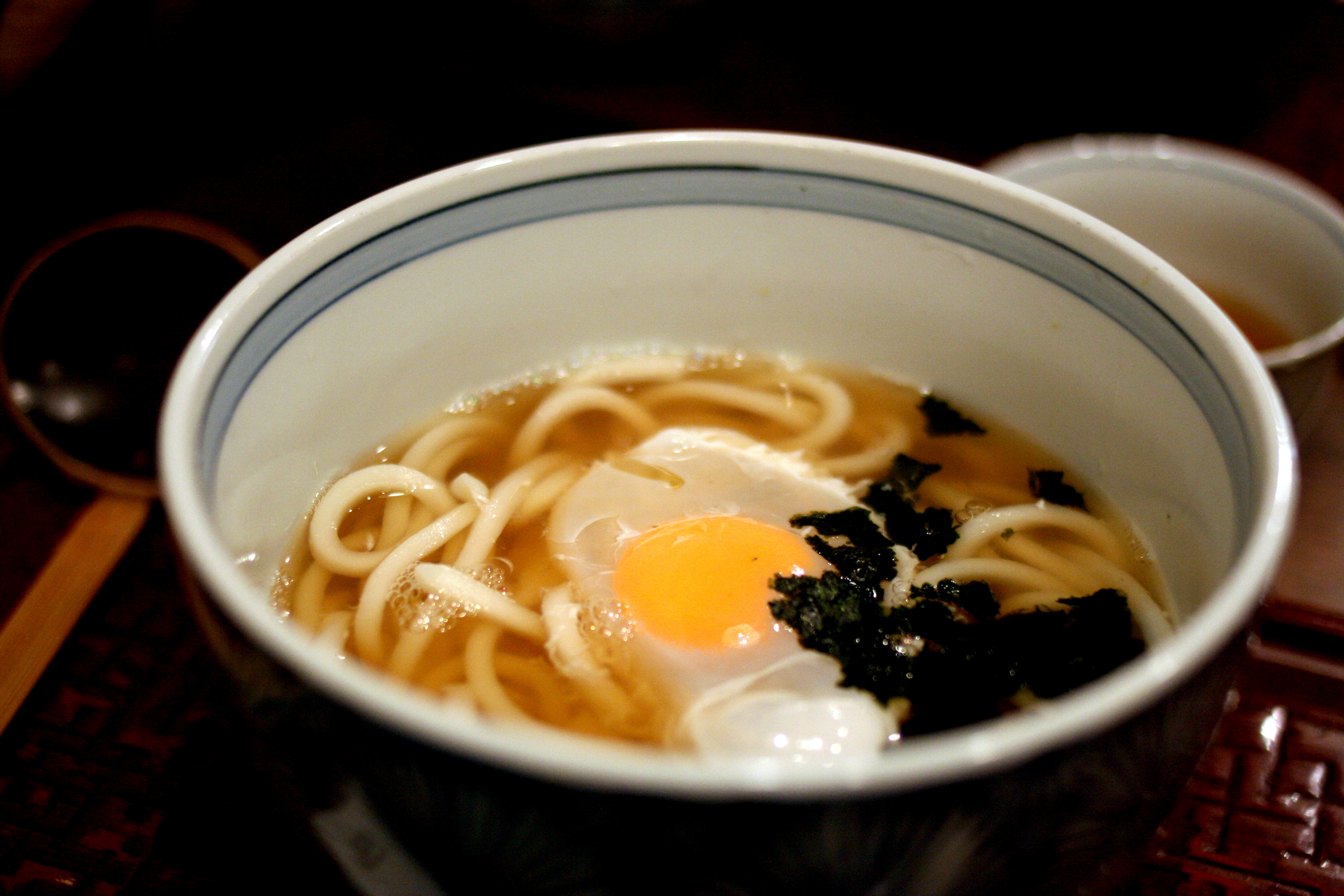
Tsukimi udon, from Kyoto

It is traditional to serve Tsukimi dango and seasonal produce offerings during Tsukimi, as described above. In addition, there are several other dishes associated with Tsukimi.

Boiled soba or udon noodles topped with nori and raw egg, then covered with broth are known as Tsukimi soba or Tsukimi udon. In Kitakyushu an egg served atop yaki udon is known as Tenmado, another name for Tsukimi in the local dialect. Similarly when a raw quail egg is used to top sushi, like battleship sushi gunkanzushi or a handroll temaki it is referred to as tsukimi style.

At some Japanese fast food restaurants, a special Fall Menu is offered during September and October featuring fried egg sandwiches known as Tsukimi burgers.

== See also ==
- List of harvest festivals
- Chuseok, the Korean autumn harvest festival held on the same day
- Mid-Autumn Festival, the Chinese Moon-observance festival held on the same day
- Hanami
