= Simalungun Protestant Christian Church =

Lutheran church in north Sumatra

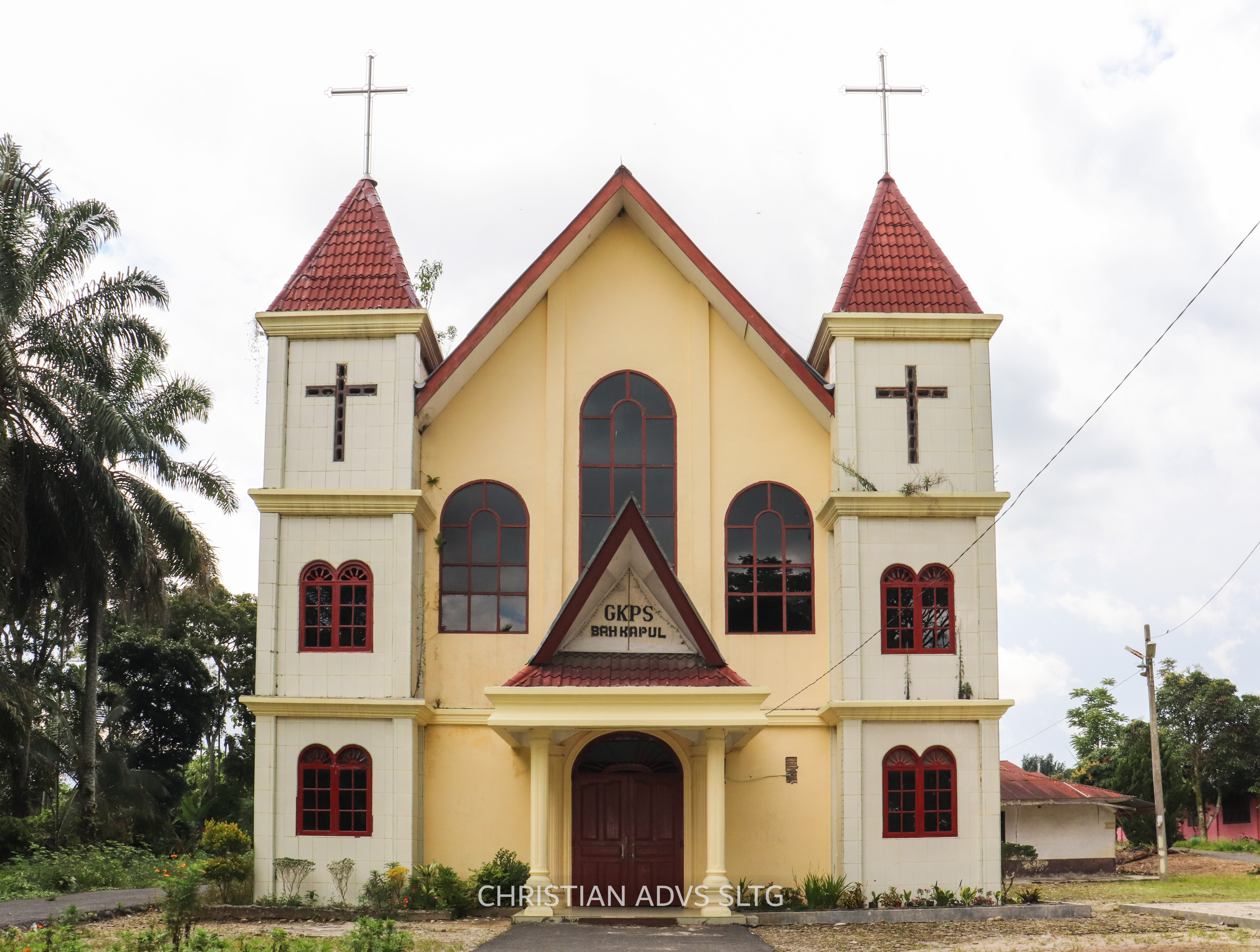
GKPS Bah Kapul, Church in Pematangsiantar, 2016

Gereja Kristen Protestan Simalungun (GKPS - Simalungun Protestant Christian Church) is an Evangelical Lutheran church formally founded to spread Christianity among the Simalungun people, a tribe living in Simalungun, North Sumatra, Indonesia. It has a baptized membership of 211,383.

== History ==
August Theis led a group of German missionaries to spread Christianity to the Simalungun area after he received a telegram from the local Rheinische Missionsgesellschaft (RMG - Deutschlands-based sending institution) leader. On 2 September 1903 they arrived at Pematang Raya to begin their mission among the Simalungunese. 2 September has been celebrated each year by GKPS all over the world as an olob-olob (Simalungunese for joyous) day to thank God that the Bible has entered Simalungun.

The sending mission was effectively started in 1904 with August Theis at Pematang Raya and Guillaume at Purba Saribu (western part of Simalungun). Not until 1909 did the first Simalungunese Christian baptism occur at Pematang Raya. Later in the same year, 38 other Simalungunese were baptized at Parapat.

Up to 1910, 17 churches were founded inside the Simalungun area. They were:

- Tigaras, 15 August 1903
- Tinjoan, 15 August 1903
- Pematang Raya, 2 September 1903
- Raya Usang, 8 September 1903
- Dolok Saribu, 14 September 1903
- Bulu Raya, 16 June 1904
- Purba Saribu, June 10, 1905
- Haranggaol, 3 March 1906
- Raya Tongah, 7 June 1906
- Purba Dolok, 15 August 1906
- Pamatang Purba, 15 August 1906
- Purba Tongah, 1906
- Hinalang, 8 September 1908
- Kariahan, 1908
- Saribudolok, 6 September 1909
- Tambun Raya, 2 November 1909

The first missions were held using the Toba language. Simalungunese resistance to the Westerners and their lack of comprehension of the Toba language decreased RMG effectiveness and therefore held back the growth of Christianity among the Simalungunese.

On 1 September 1928, the celebration of the 25th anniversary of Christianity at Simalungun was held at Pematang Raya. On this occasion, some Guru (teachers) and Sintua (deacons) agreed to found a committee which planned to translate church-related text books into the Simalungun language. This produced Haleluya (singing book) and Manna (daily reading book).

On 15 November of the same year, a group called "Kongsi Laita" (laita means "let's go") was founded at Sondiraya by some members of the Pematang Raya church to ask the Simalungunese to spread Christianity by themselves to others.

== Simalungun District inside HKBP Simalungun ==
On 26 September 1940, all of the churches inside the Simalungun area were officially grouped together as a single district inside HKBP (Huria Kristen Batak Protestan). 12 years later on 5 October 1952, Simalungun District synod members held a meeting to prepare a separation between themselves and HKBP. The new church was called HKBPS (HKBP-Simalungun).

HKBPS reorganized themselves on 30 November 1952, by dividing themselves into three districts. An administrative office was also built in Sudirman Street, Pematang Siantar, as a headquarters.

== HKBP-Simalungun transformation into GKPS ==
HKBPS transformed its organization and name into Gereja Kristen Protestan Simalungun (GKPS) on 1 September 1963. In order to serve the Simalungunese better, GKPS founded its educational center at Pematang Raya and a dormitory for boys and girls. GKPS also founded a centre for agricultural training on 15 January 1964, at Pematang Siantar, which is called PELPEM GKPS.

== Church co-operation ==
GKPS was accepted into Persekutuan Gereja-gereja Indonesia (PGI, or Indonesian churches association) in 1963. GKPS has also always co-operated strongly with Lutheran churches around the world such as the Evangelical Lutheran Church in America (ELCA) and the Lutheran Church of Australia (LCA). On the international level, GKPS is registered in several international church organization such as:

- World Council of Churches (WCC)
- Christian Conference of Asia
- Lutheran World Federation

GKPS' other overseas partners include:

- Mülheim Church (Germany)
- UEM (United Evangelical Mission)
- EZE (Evangelische Zentralstelle für Entwicklunghilfe)
- Brot für die Welt
- Kirchenkreis Hagen
- Kirchenkreis Solingen
- Kirscht di Hacenburg
- Dekanat Bad Marienberg
