= Maras Taun =

Thanksgiving and harvest festival

Maras Taun is a thanksgiving festival and harvest festival celebrated by Malays in Belitung Island and its surrounding smaller islands.

Maras in Malay Belitung dialect means "cutting" and taun means "year." Maras Taun occurs once a year after the harvest of rice from dry-field paddy fields (padi ladang or Oryza montana).

== Maras Taun in Mendanau ==
For the Mendanau islanders, rice is the main foodstuff. Rice trading connects people from island to island. The festival is celebrated by fishermen in addition to farmers. The farmers celebrate their harvest; the fishermen celebrate their successful fish hauling.

== Rites ==
The festival is opened with a farmer dance. They sing a Maras Taun song together to accompany the dance. After the dance ends, a village chief (a Muslim leader) appears and leads the people in prayer. The chief burns a piece of agarwood which causes a fragrant smell; then, he says the prayers and blesses two pieces of sacred leaves called daun hati-hati or daun kesalan, a variety of medicinal mint also known as Asian oregano. Afterward, the sacred leaves are given to the people. The islanders spread the leaves around their homes and boats because they believe that the sacred leaves bring luck.

== Lepat ==
Before the harvest festival, people gather pounded rice that will be cooked as lepat. Lepat is a variety of steamed cake made from red rice, which is filled with a piece of fish or meat and wrapped with young coconut leaves. Hundreds of lepats will be distributed to the villagers at the end of the festival.

== See also ==
- Paddy field
- Green Revolution
