= Trống quân =

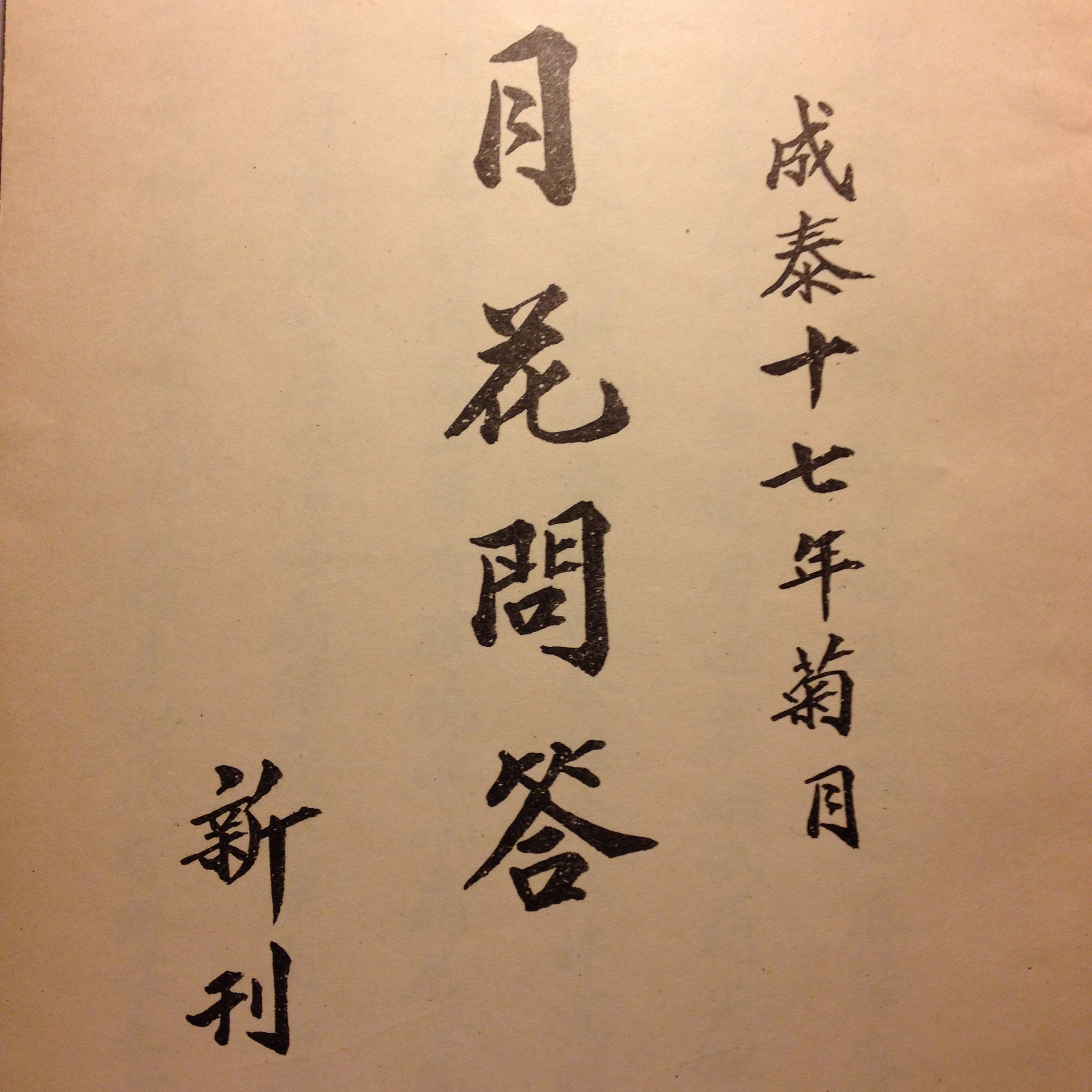
The book Nguyệt hoa vấn đáp in chữ Nôm was printed in the 17th year of Thành Thái (1905), copied the lyrics for the reciprocal cadences

Singing Trống quân recorded 1931

Trống quân singing (Vietnamese: [ʈə̌wŋm kʷən], Hán-Nôm: 𤿰軍, "military drum") is a response folk song of Vietnam. It is often found in festivals and performed as alternating singing between boys and girls. The male and female singer groups make responses to the song through words, instead of counterpoint singing. As such it is less sophisticated and more open to popular participation than Quan họ response singing which requires some degree of musical training. Trống quân songs are often sung by children at village festivals.
