= Agera (festival) =

Roman Catholic festival celebrated in Mumbai

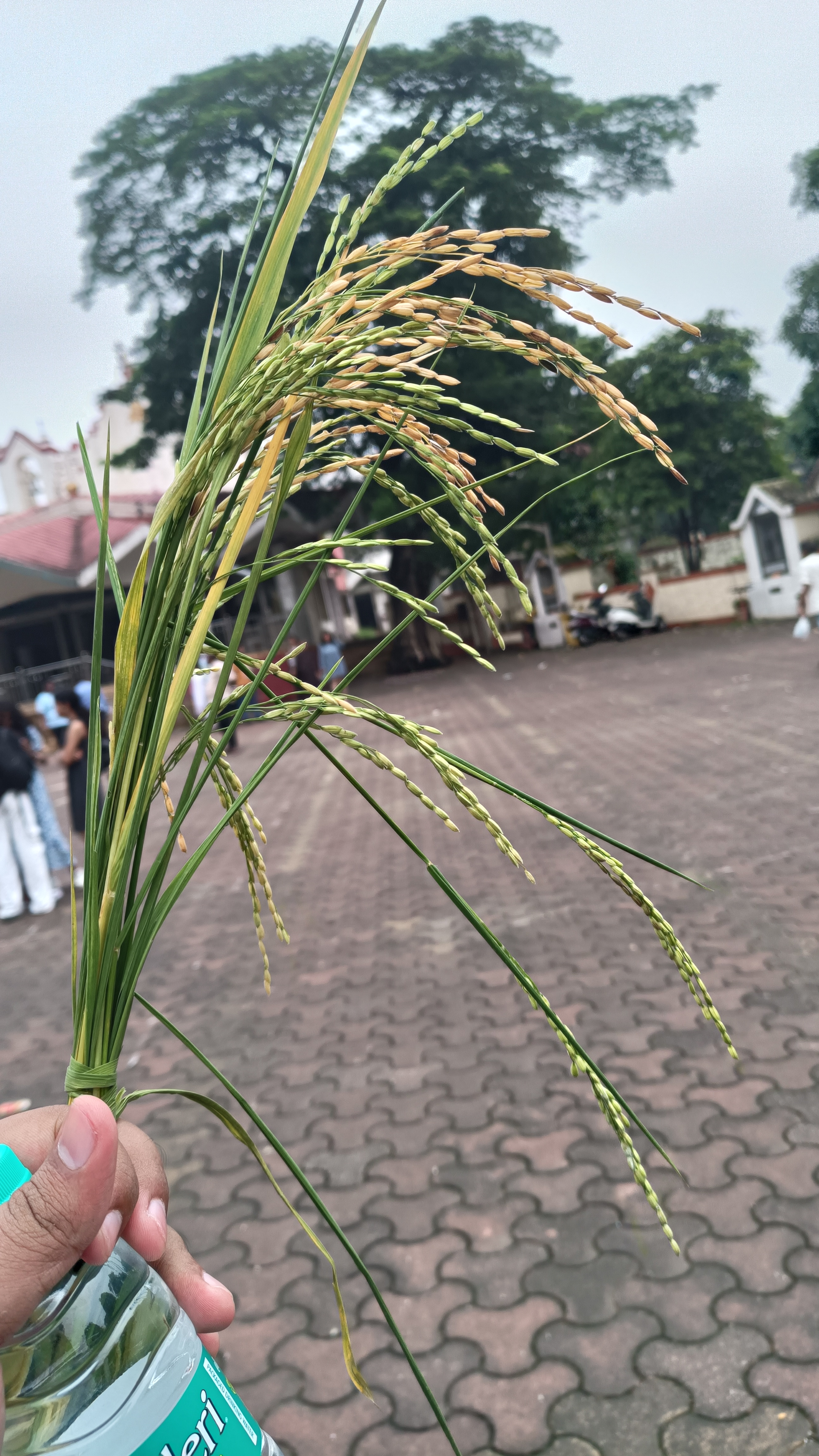
- Harvested Wheat distributed during Agera Festival at Holy Cross Church, Kurla.
- Official name: Agera, आगेरा
- Observed by: East Indian Catholics
- Significance: Commemorates the Harvest festival in Mumbai.
- Celebrations: community gathering, recitation of scriptures, blessing of harvest, sharing of harvest.
- Date: First Sunday in October
- 2024 date: 6 October
- 2025 date: 5 October
- 2026 date: 4 October
- 2027 date: 3 October
- Frequency: Annual
- Related to: Thanksgiving, Harvest festival

Agera (East Indian: आगेरा) is a thanksgiving harvest festival celebrated by the Roman Catholic community of Mumbai primarily the Bombay East Indians. This festival is also celebrated in Mumbai, Thane, Raigad and Vasai.

This traditional harvest festival is held in the beginning of October, when the grain would be ready for harvest, and lasted for five days. This Festival was celebrated by East Indian families all over Mumbai. This festival would commence with the priest in every community, going down to the fields to bless the newly harvested crop and giving thanks to God, along with the farmers and villagers. After coming together in prayer, the community would celebrate with delicious food, singing and dance.

== Etymology ==
The word Agera is derived from Latin words Ager which means field or farm and Agricola which means Farmer

== Date ==
Agera falls on the first Sunday of October. It is normally called the Harvest festival where farmers cut the crops and offer the first fruits to God. It is normally seen throughout India where different communities celebrate this festive in their own ways.

== Celebrations ==
The East Indians were the people who were engaged in agricultural activities. In the observed festival, paddy is harvested and subsequently brought to local churches in a ceremonial procession. This procession is characteristically accompanied by the East Indian Band. Members of the Catholic community transport the paddy on horse-drawn or bullock carts, culminating in its presentation at the church. Upon arrival, priests bestow blessings upon the harvest. Following the religious services, the blessed harvest is distributed to the households in attendance. The festival culminates with East Indian cultural events held in various villages, including Kurla, Marol, and others.
