= Làng Cả =

Archaeological site in Vietnam

Làng Cả (Việt Trì) is an archaeological site in the Red River Delta in northern Vietnam. Excavations there yielded a number of coffins containing relics of the Bronze Age Dong Son culture.

The site is located just upstream from the merging of the Red River and the Black River near Việt Trì.

A single radiocarbon dating sample from coffin wood that was exhumed from the site suggested that the artefacts were from the second phase of the Dong Son culture, estimated to be between 382 BCE and 195 BCE.

309 graves were described in Vietnamese archaeological records, but no cemetery plans or a list of graves and contents was recorded. The Vietnamese archaeologists Trinh Sinh and Ngo Si Hong did refer to recorded evidence of the presence of comparatively wealthy graves in certain parts of the cemetery. The graves in the eastern sector had a paucity of material goods enclosed in the coffins, while those in the west were much wealthier and accounted for 85.8% of the bronze that was recovered from the burial site.

One exhumed grave was postulated to belong to a specialist bronze worker, since he was buried with the tools of a metal worker: a spearhead, sword hilt, bell and ceramic moulds used in casting axes. The mould had a capacity of holding up to 12 kg of molten metal.

The record of the excavation recorded that 217 different types of grave goods were observed, predominantly of bronze. The bronze items were mostly weapons, with there being 62 spearheads, 36 axes, three knives and six daggers. Some of the weapons were decorated with geometric patterns and pictorial scenes of deer, dogs and people travelling on water transport. There were also bronze vessels, including four thap and four au, six bells and a miniature drum.

The excavation yielded only twenty ceramic vessels, and no iron was found, similar to the lack of iron reported at Viet Khe and Chau Can. One of the moulds was designed to cast a sword hilt, and it was postulated that iron might have been used to cast the blade, although the excavations showed that iron was likely to have been in short supply during the time.
