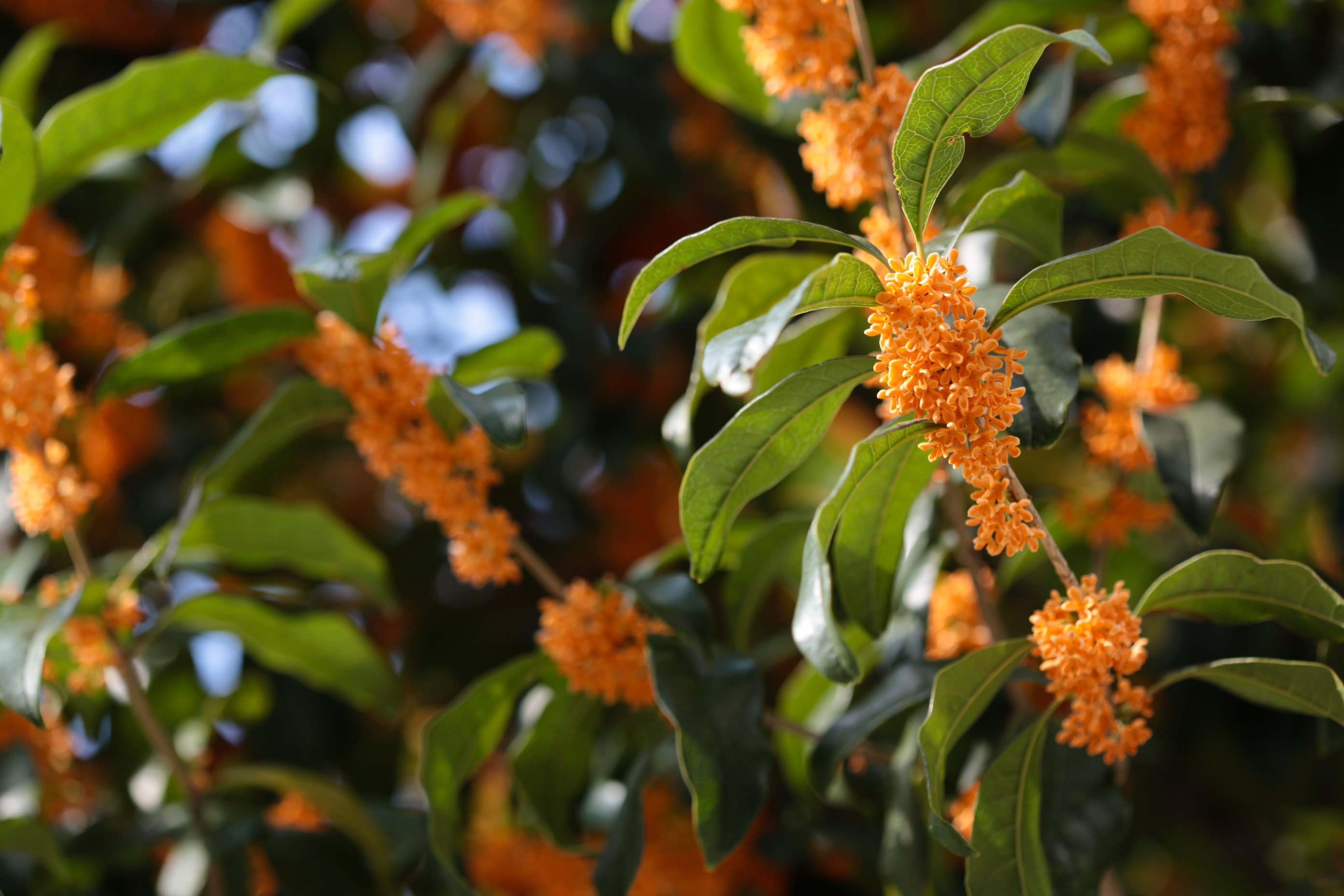

Conservation status
- Least Concern (IUCN 3.1)

Scientific classification
- Kingdom: Plantae
- Clade: Tracheophytes
- Clade: Angiosperms
- Clade: Eudicots
- Clade: Asterids
- Order: Lamiales
- Family: Oleaceae
- Genus: Osmanthus
- Species: O. fragrans

Binomial name
- Osmanthus fragrans Lour.

Synonyms
- List: Notelaea posua D.Don; Olea acuminata Wall. ex G.Don; Olea buchananii Lamb. ex D.Don; Olea fragrans Thunb.; Olea ovalis Miq.; Olea posua Buch.-Ham. ex D.Don [Invalid]; Osmanthus acuminatus (Wall. ex G.Don) Nakai; Osmanthus asiaticus Nakai; Osmanthus aurantiacus (Makino) Nakai; Osmanthus intermedius Nakai; Osmanthus latifolius (Makino) Koidz.; Osmanthus longibracteatus H.T.Chang; Osmanthus macrocarpus P.Y.Pai

= Osmanthus fragrans =

Species of plant

Osmanthus fragrans (lit. 'fragrant osmanthus') is a species of flowering plant in the family Oleaceae. In English, it is sometimes referred to by the common names sweet osmanthus, sweet olive, tea olive, and fragrant olive. It is native to Assam, Cambodia, China, the Himalayas, Hainan, Japan, Myanmar, Taiwan, Nepal, Thailand, and Vietnam. In China it grows in the provinces of Guizhou, Sichuan, Hainan, and Yunnan.

In China, it is the "city flower" of the cities of Hangzhou, Zhejiang; Suzhou, Jiangsu; and Guilin, Guangxi. In Japan, it is the "city tree" of Kitanagoya, Aichi Prefecture; Kashima, Saga Prefecture; Beppu, Ōita Prefecture; and the "town tree" of Yoshitomi, Fukuoka Prefecture.

== Etymology ==
The genus name Osmanthus is composed of two Greek etymons: osma meaning "smell" and anthos meaning "flower". The specific name fragrans is a borrowing from the Latin meaning "odorous, fragrant" referring to the intense fragrance of its flowers.

== Growth ==
It is an evergreen shrub or small tree growing to 3–12 m (9.8–39.4 ft) tall. The leaves are 7–15 cm (2.8–5.9 in) long and 2.6–5 cm (1.0–2.0 in) broad, with an entire or finely toothed margin. The flowers are white, pale yellow, yellow, or orange-yellow, small, about 1 cm (0.39 in) long, with a four-lobed corolla 5 mm (0.20 in) diameter, and have a strong fragrance; they are produced in small clusters in the late summer and autumn. The fruit is a purple-black drupe 10–15 mm (0.39–0.59 in) long containing a single hard-shelled seed; it is mature in the spring about six months after flowering.

== Cultivation ==
It is cultivated as an ornamental plant in East Asian gardens, and gardens in Europe, North America, Australia and elsewhere in the world for its deliciously fragrant flowers which carry the scent of ripe peaches or apricots. A number of cultivars have been selected for garden use, with varying flower colors, such as Osmanthus fragrans 'Yanhua' with its variegated foliage and orange blooms. Within Japan, the white- and orange-blossoming subspecies are distinguished as ginmokusei (lit. "silver osmanthus") and kinmokusei (lit. "gold osmanthus"), respectively.

== Uses ==
=== Culinary ===
In Chinese cuisine, its flowers may be infused with green or black tea leaves to create osmanthus tea (桂花茶; guìhuāchá). The flowers are also used to produce osmanthus-scented jam, osmanthus cakes, dumplings, soups, and osmanthus liquor. Osmanthus jam is used as an ingredient in a type of gruel called chátāng, which is made from sorghum or millet flour and sugar mixed with boiling water. This dish is associated with the northern city of Tianjin, although it may also be found in Beijing.

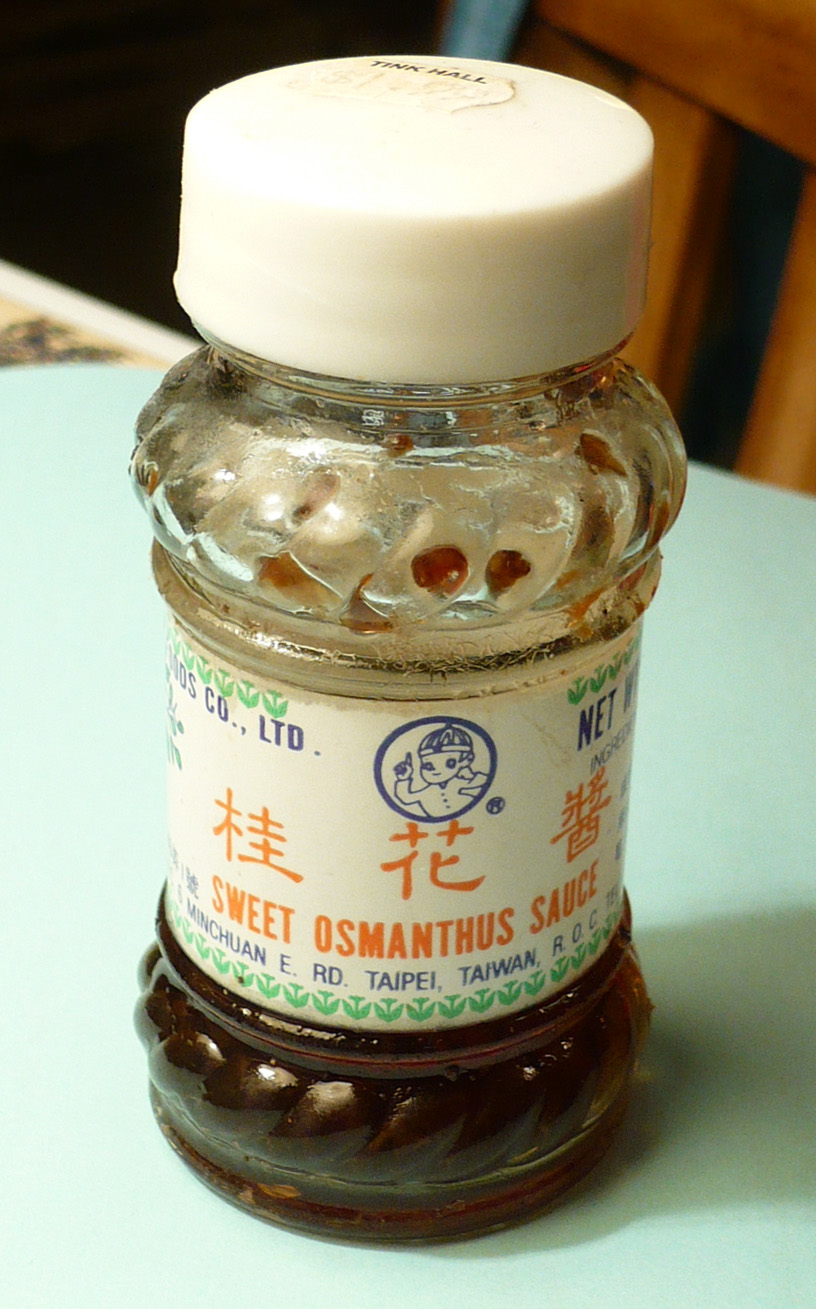
A small jar of sweet osmanthus jam

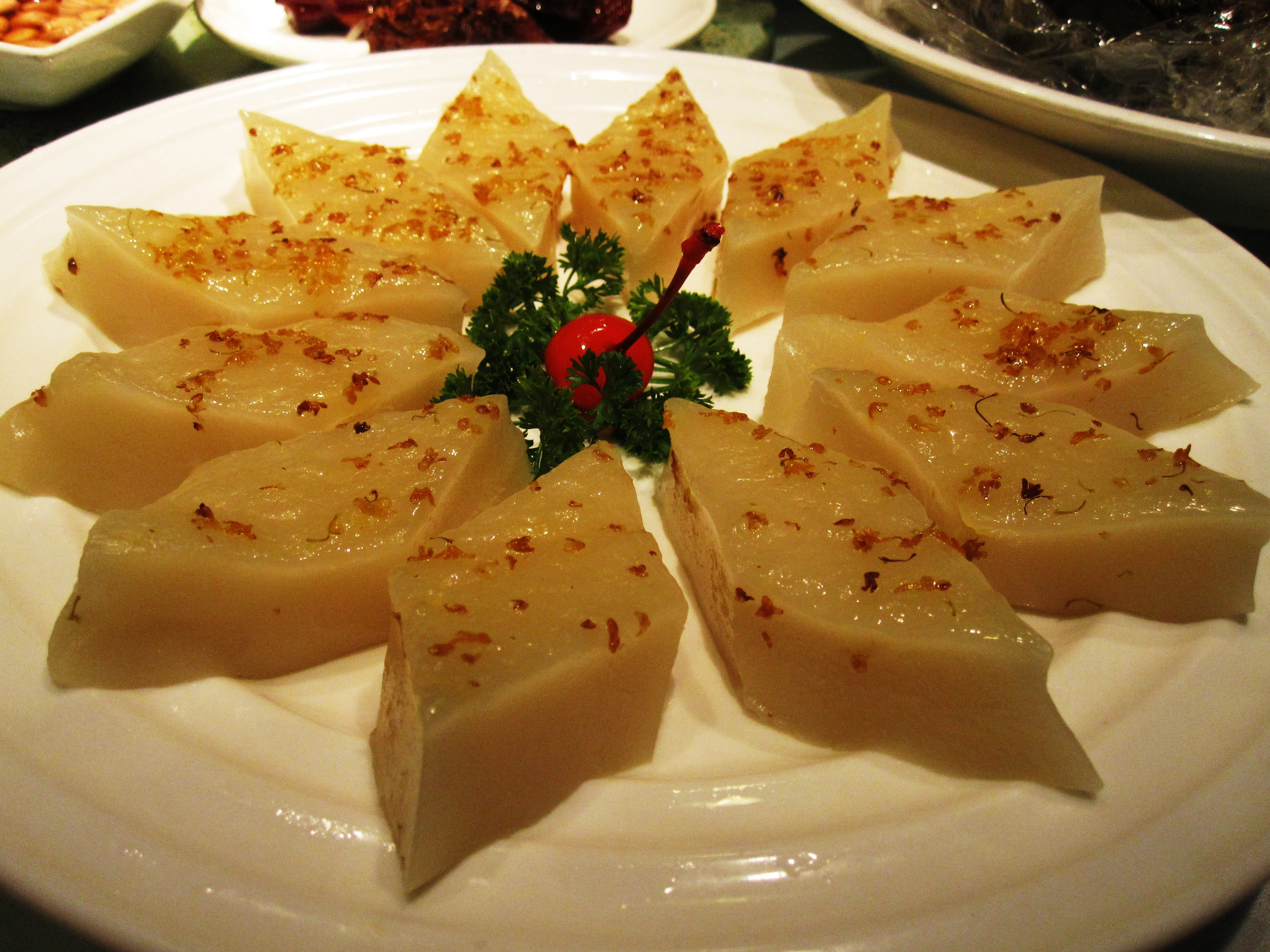
Rice cake perfumed with sweet olive infusion

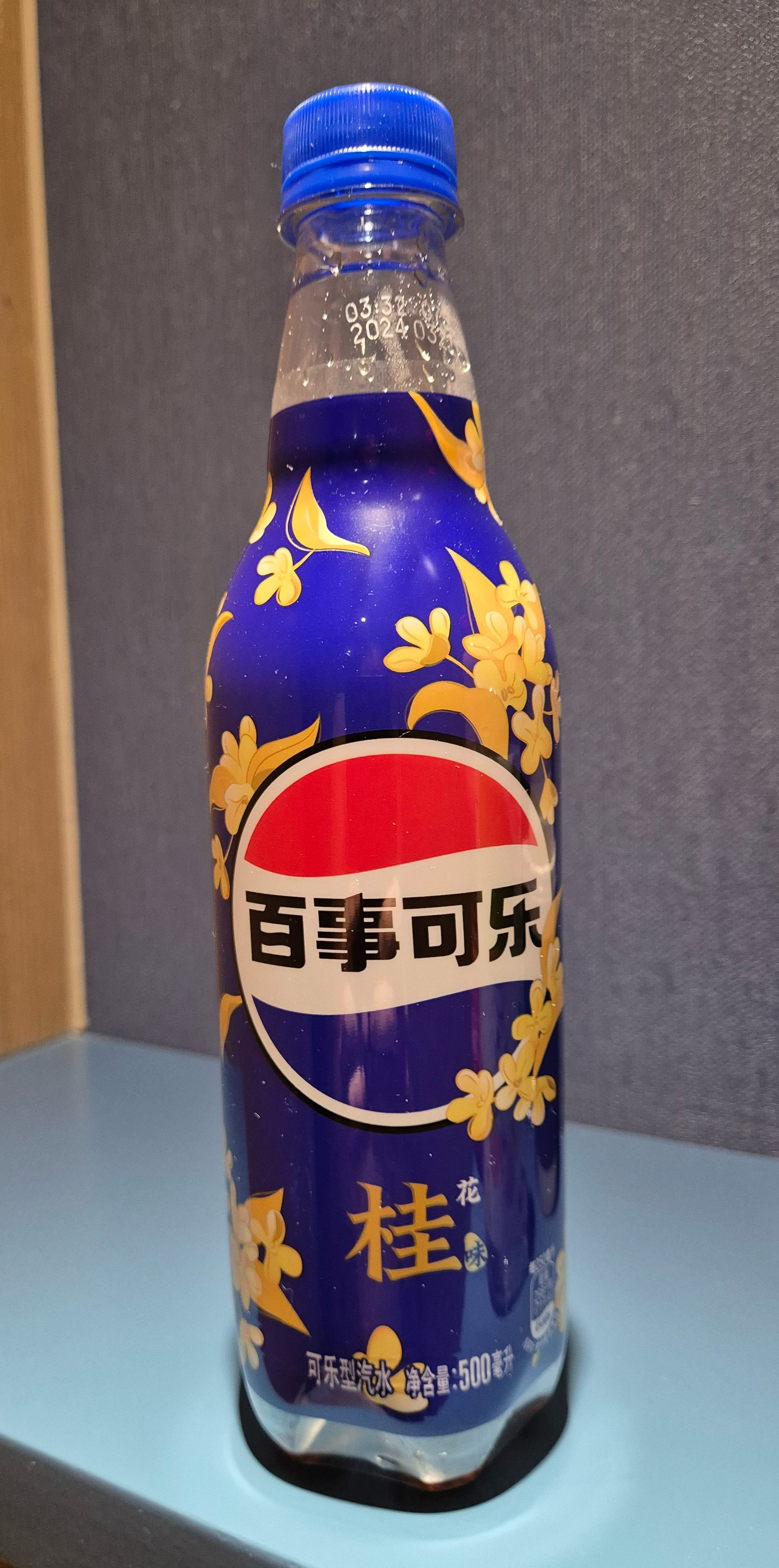
A Chinese bottle of osmanthus-flavored Pepsi

Osmanthus is also used for making many traditional Chinese desserts, such as osmanthus tangyuan with rice wine syrup.

=== Repellent ===
In some regions of northern India, especially in the state of Uttarakhand, the flowers of sweet osmanthus are used to protect clothes from insects.

=== Medicinal ===
In traditional Chinese medicine, osmanthus tea has been used as an herbal tea for the treatment of irregular menstruation. The extract of dried flowers showed neuroprotective, free-radical scavenging, antioxidative effects in in vitro assays.

== Cultural associations ==
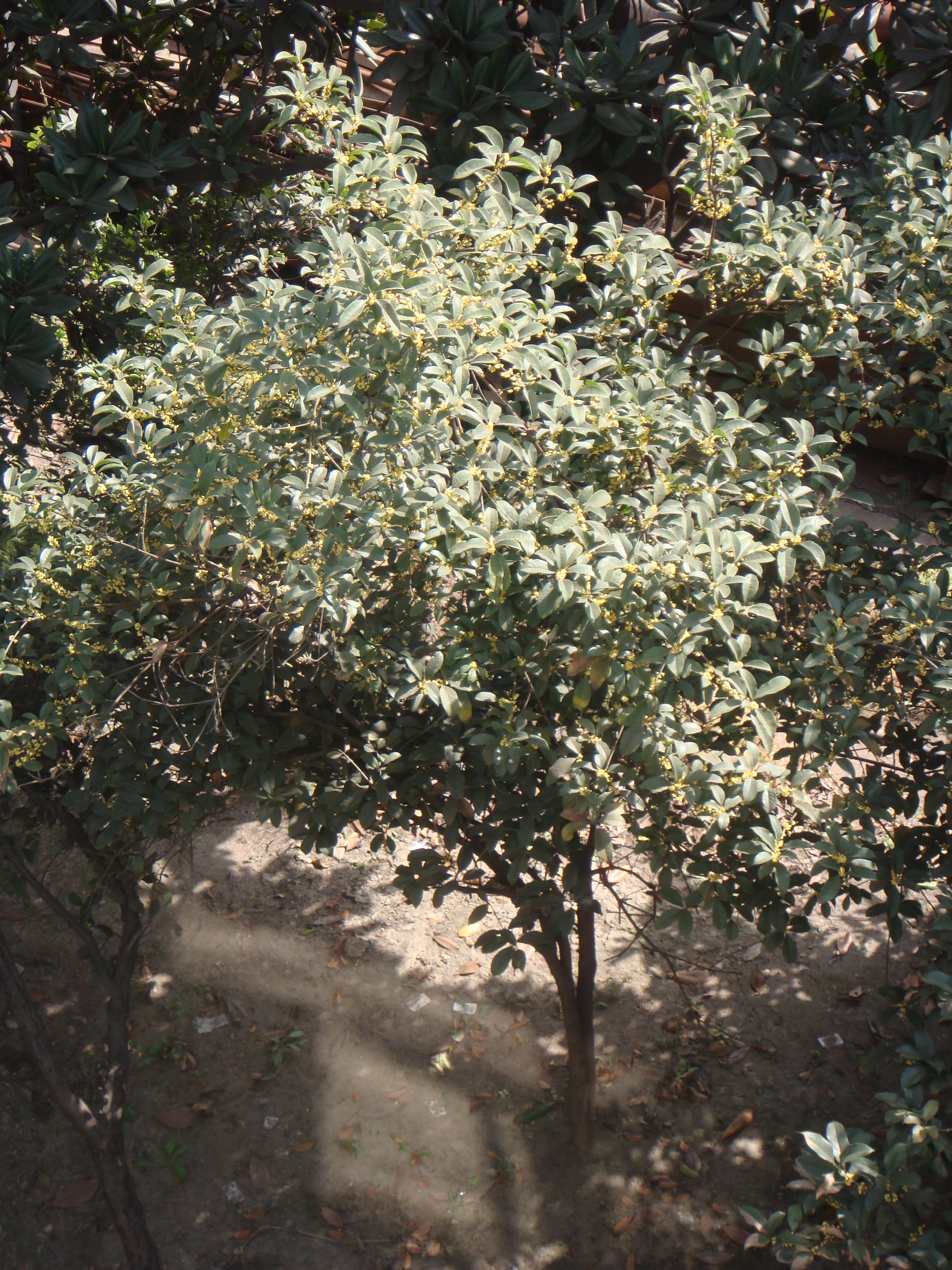
Osmanthus fragrans in full bloom (October) in Jingjiang, China

From the occasion of its blossoming, the sweet osmanthus is closely associated with the Chinese Mid-Autumn Festival. Osmanthus wine is a traditional choice for the "reunion wine" drunk with one's family, and osmanthus-flavored confections and teas may also be consumed. Chinese mythology held that a sweet osmanthus grows on the moon and was endlessly cut by Wu Gang: (Note: The tree was originally identified as a 桂 (guì) and described in the terms of the osmanthus. However, in English, it is often associated with the more well-known cassia (Cinnamomum cassia, now known in Chinese as the 肉桂 or "meat gui"); while, in Chinese, it has instead become associated with the Mediterranean laurel, which is now known as the 月桂 or "Moon gui", from the similar associations of victory and success.) some versions held that he was forced to cut it every 1000 years lest its luxuriant growth overshadow the moon itself, others that he was obliged to cut it constantly only to see it regrow an equal amount every day.

In late imperial China, the osmanthus was also associated with the imperial examinations, which were held in the 8th lunar month. The chengyu "pluck osmanthus in the Toad Palace" was a refined paraphrase for "passing the exam", in part since one would attract hangers-on as if he smelled as sweet as osmanthus thereafter. "Breaking the osmanthus twig and mounting the dragon" was another euphemism, in this case, for sex.
