= Xuân La =

Xuân La may refer to places in Vietnam:

- Xuân La, Tây Hồ, Hanoi, an archeological site
- Xuân La, Pác Nặm, Bắc Kạn Province
