= Mid-Autumn Festival =

Chinese harvest festival

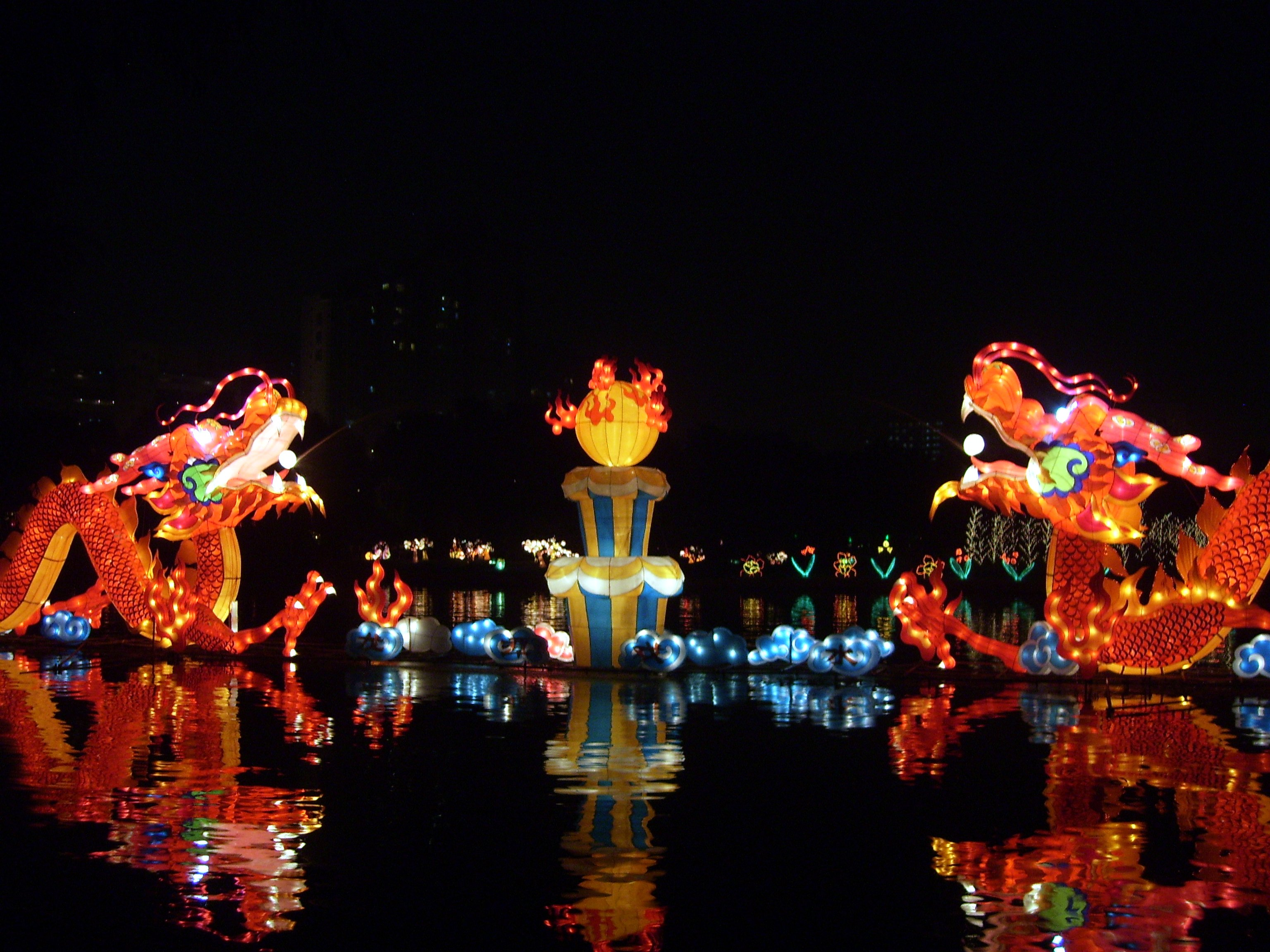
- Festival decorations in Beijing
- Also called: Moon Festival, Mooncake Festival
- Observed by: Chinese people
- Type: Cultural, religious
- Significance: To celebrate the end of the autumn harvest
- Celebrations: Lantern lighting, mooncake making and sharing, courtship and matchmaking, fireworks, family gatherings, dragon dances, family meals, visiting friends and relatives, gift-giving
- Observances: Consumption of mooncakes and cassia wine
- Date: 15th day of the 8th month of the Chinese lunisolar calendar
- 2025 date: 6 October
- 2026 date: 25 September
- 2027 date: 15 September
- Frequency: Annual
- Related to: Chuseok (Korea), Tsukimi (Japan), Tết Trung Thu (Vietnam), Uposatha of Ashvini or Krittika (Cambodia, Laos, Myanmar, Sri Lanka, and Thailand)

Chinese name
- Traditional Chinese: 中秋節
- Simplified Chinese: 中秋节
- Literal meaning: "Mid-Autumn Festival"
Transcriptions
Standard Mandarin
- Hanyu Pinyin: Zhōngqiū jié
- Wade–Giles: Chung^{1}-ch'iu^{1} chieh^{2}
- IPA: [ʈʂʊ́ŋ.tɕʰjóʊ tɕjě]
Wu
- Romanization: Tson-tshieu tsiq
Hakka
- Romanization: Chûng-chhiû-chiet; Zúng qiú jièd
Yue: Cantonese
- Yale Romanization: Jūng-chāu jit
- Jyutping: Zung^{1}-cau^{1} zit^{3}
- IPA: [tsʊŋ˥.tsʰɐw˥ tsit̚˧]
Southern Min
- Hokkien POJ: Tiong-chhiu-cheh
- Tâi-lô: Tiong-tshiu-tseh
Eastern Min
- Fuzhou BUC: Dṳ̆ng-chiŭ-cáik

Calendar date name
- Chinese: 八月十五/八月半
- Literal meaning: "Fifteenth/Half of the Eighth Month"
Transcriptions
Standard Mandarin
- Hanyu Pinyin: Bāyuè shíwǔ/bàn
Wu
- Romanization: Paq^{7}-yuq^{8} zeq^{8}-ng^{6} Paq^{7}-yuq^{8}-poe^{5}
Hakka
- Romanization: Bàd ngiad seb ǹg Bàd ngiad ban
Yue: Cantonese
- Jyutping: Baat^{3} jyut^{6} sap^{6} ng^{5}
Southern Min
- Hokkien POJ: Poeh-ge̍h-cha̍p-gō͘ Poeh-ge̍h-pòaⁿ
- Tâi-lô: Peh-gue̍h-tsa̍p-gōo

Regional name
- Traditional Chinese: 八月節
- Literal meaning: "Eighth Month Festival"
Transcriptions
Hakka
- Romanization: Pat-ngie̍t-chiet
Southern Min
- Hokkien POJ: Peh-go̍eh-cheh
- Tâi-lô: Peh-gue̍h-tseh
Eastern Min
- Fuzhou BUC: Báik-nguŏk-cáik

The Mid-Autumn Festival, also known as the Moon Festival or Mooncake Festival, is a harvest festival celebrated in Chinese culture. It occurs on the 15th day of the 8th month of the Chinese lunisolar calendar and can fall between 7 September and 8 October (inclusive) of the Gregorian calendar. On this day, the Chinese believe that the moon is at its fullest and brightest, coinciding with the time of harvest in the middle of autumn.

The Mid-Autumn Festival is one of the most important holidays and celebrations in Chinese culture. The history of the festival dates back now over 3,000 years. Similar festivals are celebrated by other countries in East and Southeast Asia, including Taiwan, Japan, South Korea, Vietnam, Malaysia and Singapore for example.

During the festival, lanterns of all sizes and shapes – symbolizing beacons that light the path toward prosperity and good fortune for the people – are carried and displayed. Mooncakes, a rich pastry typically filled with sweet-bean or lotus-seed paste, are eaten during this festival. The Mid-Autumn Festival is based on the legend of Chang'e, the Moon goddess in Chinese mythology.

It is an official holiday in both mainland China and Taiwan, and the day after the Mid-Autumn Festival is an official holiday in both Hong Kong and Macau.

== Etymology ==
The festival is so-named as it is held around the autumn equinox on the 15th of the 8th lunisolar month in the Chinese calendar. Its name varies among Sinitic languages, with the most common one being Mid-Autumn Festival or simply Mid-Autumn (中秋), as well as its traditional calendar date, either Fifteenth of the Eighth Month or Half of the Eighth Month, which is more regional. Other regional names include Eighth Month Festival, used in places such as Northeast China, Southern Fujian, and Jianghuai; Festival of Unity (simplified Chinese: 团圆节; traditional Chinese: 團圓節; Wugniu: doe^{2}-yoe^{2}-ciq^{7}; Nanjingese: tuang^{2} üän^{2} zie^{5}), used in Shanghai and Nanjing; and Mooncake Festival (simplified Chinese: 月饼节; traditional Chinese: 月餅節; Jyutping: jyut^{6} beng^{2} zit^{3}), used in Guangdong and Hong Kong. Outside of Greater China area, there are several other names for the festival:

- Chuseok (추석; 秋夕; lit. ''autumn eve''), Korean festival celebrated on the same day in the Chinese and other East Asian lunisolar calendars.
- Tsukimi (月見; lit. 'moon viewing'), Japanese variant of the Mid-Autumn Festival celebrated on the same day in the Chinese lunisolar calendar.
  - Moon Festival or Harvest Moon Festival, because of the celebration's association with the full moon on this night, as well as the traditions of Moon worship and Moon viewing.
- Tết Trung Thu (節中秋 in Chữ Nôm), in Vietnam.
  - Also known as The Children's Festival in Vietnam. Most festival songs are sung by the children.
- Lantern Festival, a term sometimes used in Singapore, Malaysia and Indonesia, which is not to be confused with the Lantern Festival in China that occurs on the 15th day of the first month of the Chinese calendar.
  - However, 'Mid-Autumn Festival' is more widely used by locals when referring to the festival in English and 'Zhōngqiū Jié' is used when referring to the festival in Chinese.
- Bon Om Touk, or The Water and Moon Festival in Cambodian. The festival is held each year in November for 3 days.

== Meanings ==
The festival celebrates three fundamental concepts that are closely connected:

- Gathering: Such as family and friends coming together, or harvesting crops for the festival. It is said that the Moon is the brightest and roundest on this day which means family reunion. Consequently, this is the main reason why the festival is thought to be important.
- Giving thanks: To give thanks for the harvest, or for harmonious unions through activities like giving mooncakes to each other.
- Praying (asking for conceptual or material satisfaction): Praying for things such as babies, a spouse, beauty, longevity, or a good future.

Traditions and myths surrounding the festival are formed around these concepts, although traditions have changed over time due to changes in technology, science, economy, culture, and religion.

== Origins and development ==
The Chinese have celebrated the harvest during the autumn full moon since the Shang dynasty (c. 1600–1046 BCE). The term mid-autumn (中秋) first appeared in Rites of Zhou, a written collection of rituals of the Western Zhou dynasty (1046–771 BCE). As for the royal court, it was dedicated to the goddess Taiyin Xingjun. This is still true for Taoism and Chinese folk religion.

The celebration as a festival only started to gain popularity during the early Tang dynasty (618–907 CE). One legend explains that Emperor Xuanzong of Tang started to hold formal celebrations in his palace after having explored the Moon-Palace.

By the Ming and Qing Dynasties, the Mid-Autumn Festival had become one of the main folk festivals in China. The Empress Dowager Cixi (late 19th century) enjoyed celebrating Mid-Autumn Festival so much that she would spend the period between the thirteenth and seventeenth day of the eighth month staging elaborate rituals.

=== Moon worship ===
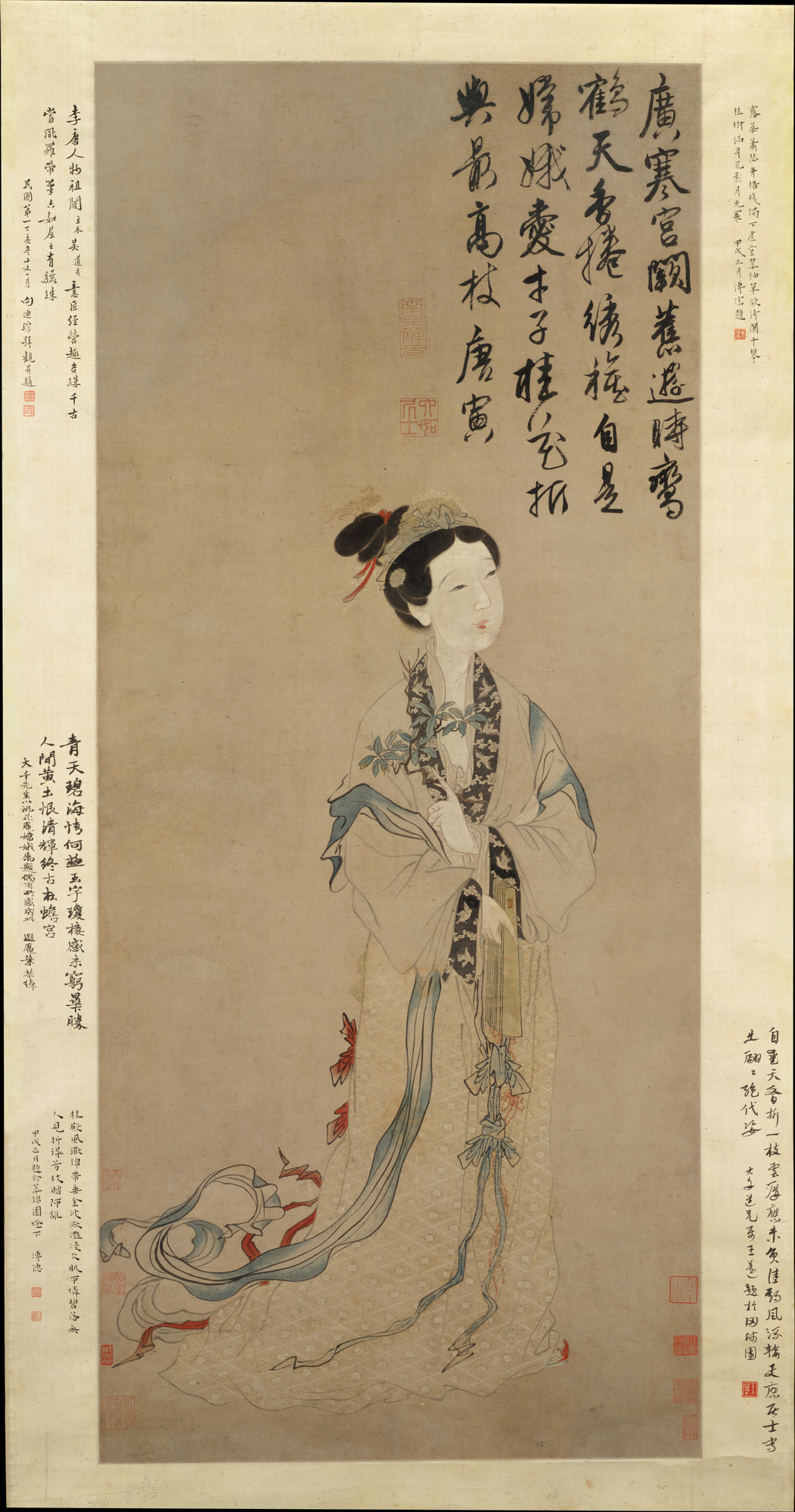
Chang'e, the Moon Goddess of Immortality

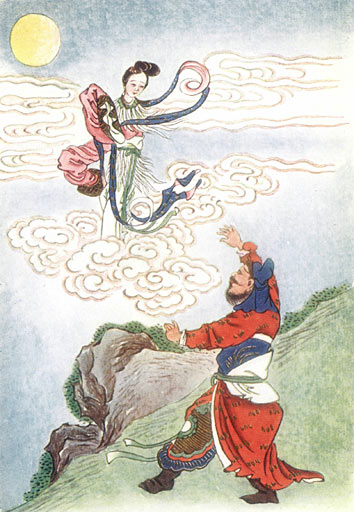
Houyi helplessly looking at his wife Chang'e flying off to the Moon after she drank the elixir.

An important part of the festival celebration is Moon worship. The ancient Chinese believed in rejuvenation being associated with the Moon and water, and connected this concept to menstruation, calling it "monthly water". The Zhuang people, for example, have an ancient fable saying the Sun and Moon are a couple and the stars are their children, and when the Moon is pregnant, it becomes round, and then becomes crescent after giving birth to a child. These beliefs made it popular among women to worship and give offerings to the Moon on this evening. In some areas of China, there are still customs in which the "men do not worship the moon and the women do not offer sacrifices to the kitchen gods."

In China, the Mid-Autumn Festival symbolizes the family reunion and on this day, all families will appreciate the Moon in the evening, because it is the 15th day of the eighth month of the Chinese lunisolar calendar, when the moon is at its fullest.

Offerings are also made to a more well-known lunar deity, Chang'e, known as the Moon Goddess of Immortality. The myths associated with Chang'e explain the origin of Moon worship during this day. One version of the story is as follows, as described in Lihui Yang's Handbook of Chinese Mythology:

In the ancient past, there was a hero named Hou Yi who was excellent at archery. His wife was Chang'e. One year, the ten suns rose in the sky together, causing great disaster to the people. Yi shot down nine of the suns and left only one to provide light. An immortal admired Yi and sent him the elixir of immortality. Yi did not want to leave Chang'e and be immortal without her, so he let Chang'e keep the elixir. However, Peng Meng, one of his apprentices, knew this secret. So, on the fifteenth of August in the Chinese lunisolar calendar, when Yi went hunting, Peng Meng broke into Yi's house and forced Chang'e to give the elixir to him. Chang'e refused to do so. Instead, she swallowed it and flew into the sky. Since she loved her husband and hoped to live nearby, she chose the moon for her residence. When Yi came back and learned what had happened, he felt so sad that he displayed the fruits and cakes Chang'e liked in the yard and gave sacrifices to his wife. People soon learned about these activities, and sympathetic to Chang'e, they also participated in these sacrifices with Yi.

"when people learned of this story, they burnt incense on a long altar and prayed to Chang'e, now the goddess of the Moon, for luck and safety. The custom of praying to the Moon on Mid-Autumn Day has been handed down for thousands of years since that time."

Handbook of Chinese Mythology also describes an alternate common version of the myth:

After the hero Houyi shot down nine of the ten suns, he was pronounced king by the thankful people. However, he soon became a conceited and tyrannical ruler. In order to live long without death, he asked for the elixir from Xiwangmu. But his wife, Chang'e, stole it on the fifteenth of August because she did not want the cruel king to live long and hurt more people. She took the magic potion to prevent her husband from becoming immortal. Houyi was so angry when discovered that Chang'e took the elixir, he shot at his wife as she flew toward the moon, though he missed. Chang'e fled to the moon and became the spirit of the moon. Houyi died soon because he was overcome with great anger. Thereafter, people offer a sacrifice to Chang'e on every fifteenth day of eighth month to commemorate Chang'e's action.

In 2005, the Chinese Communist Party called for the revival of the festival.

== Celebration ==
The festival was a time to enjoy the successful reaping of rice and wheat with food offerings made in honor of the moon. Today, it is still an occasion for outdoor reunions among friends and relatives to eat mooncakes and watch the Moon, a symbol of harmony and unity. During a year of a solar eclipse, it is typical for governmental offices, banks, and schools to close extra days in order to enjoy the extended celestial celebration an eclipse brings. The festival is celebrated with many cultural or regional customs, among them:

- Burning incense in reverence to deities including Chang'e.
- Performance of dragon and lion dances, which is mainly practiced in southern China.

=== Lanterns ===
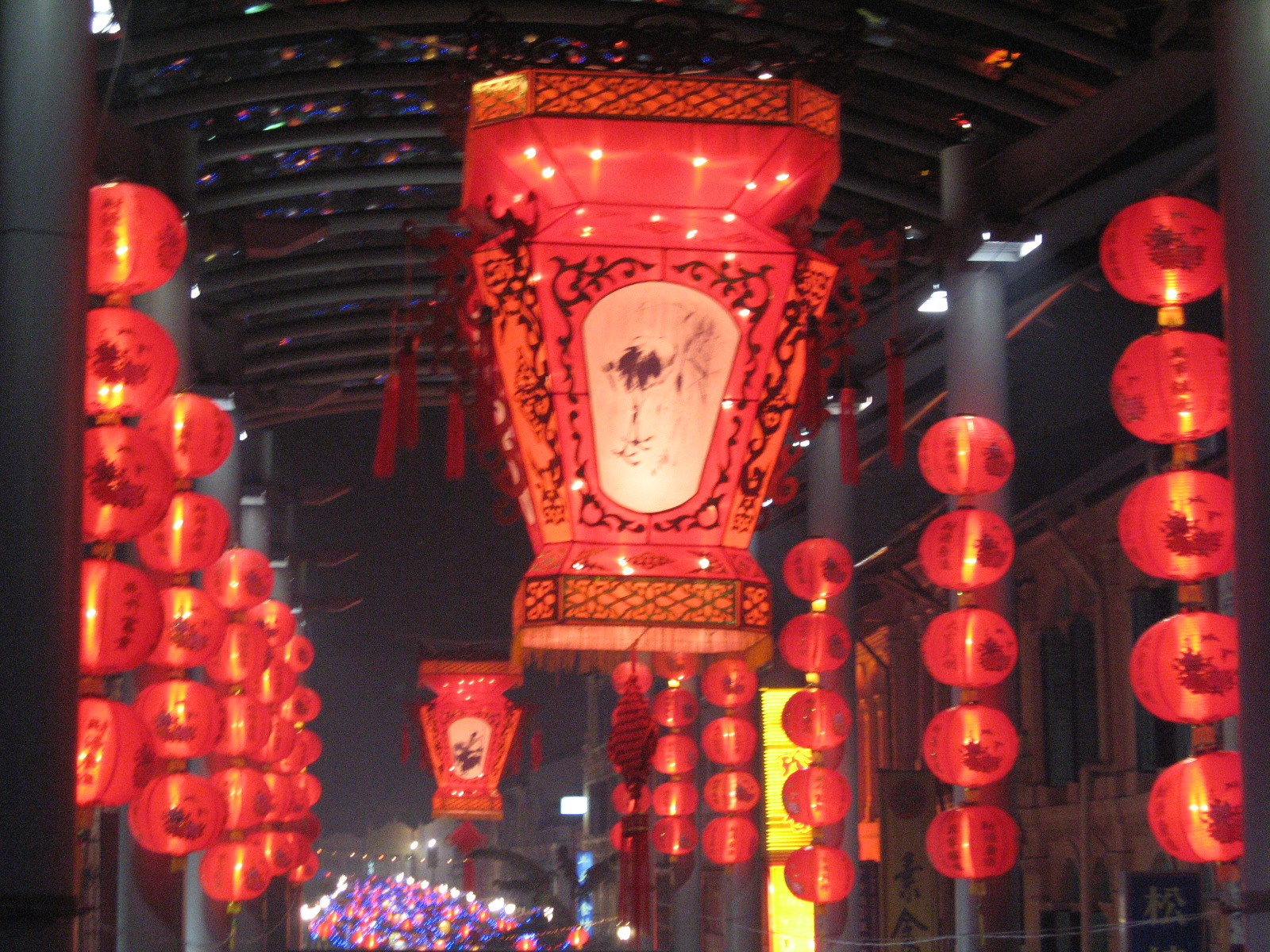
Mid-Autumn Festival lanterns in Chinatown, Singapore

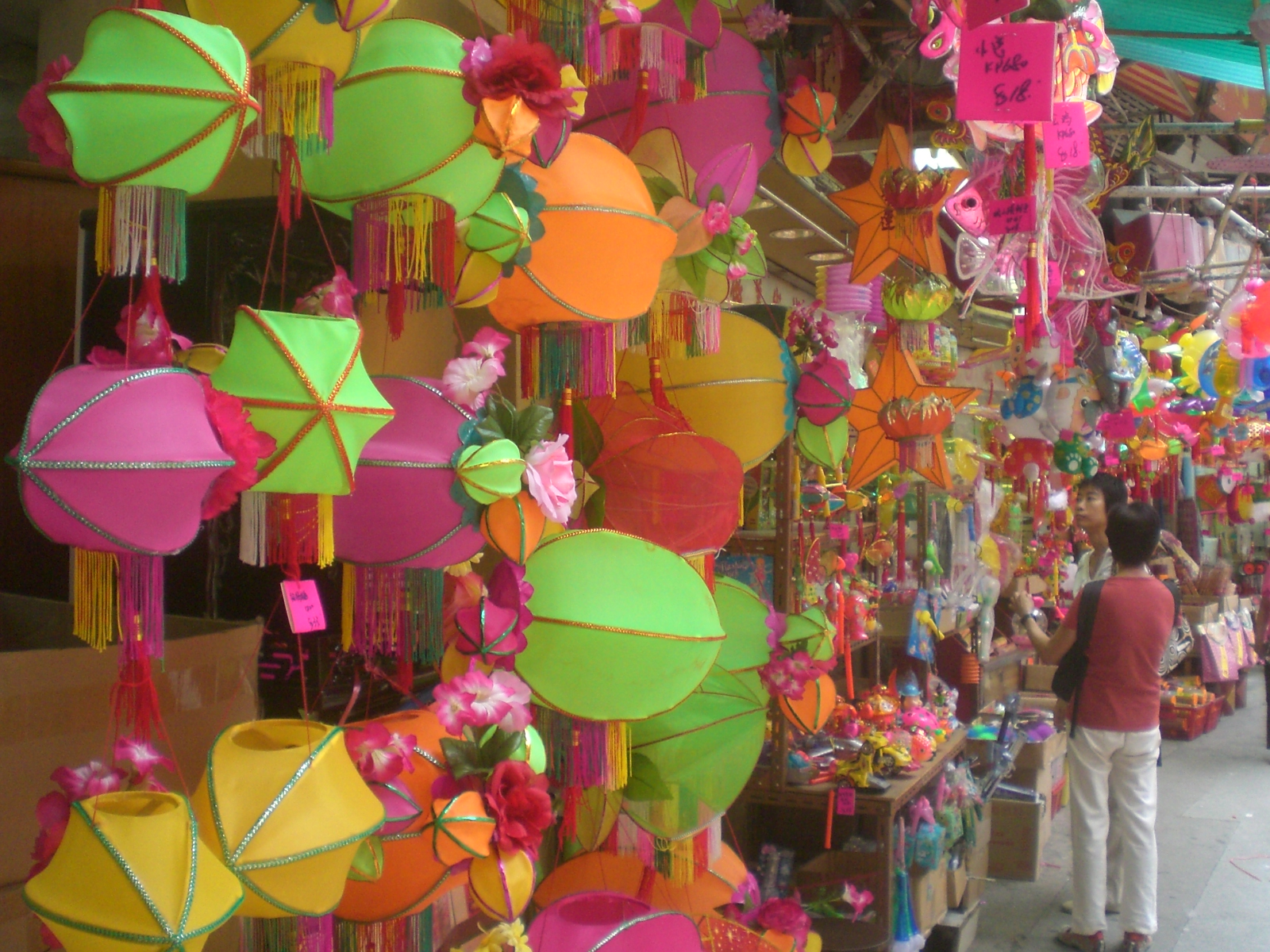
Mid-Autumn Festival lanterns at a shop in Hong Kong

A notable part of celebrating the holiday is the carrying of brightly lit lanterns, lighting lanterns on towers, or floating sky lanterns. Another tradition involving lanterns is to write riddles on them and have other people try to guess the answers (simplified Chinese: 灯谜; traditional Chinese: 燈謎; pinyin: dēng mí; lit. 'lantern riddles').

It is difficult to discern the original purpose of lanterns in connection to the festival, but it is certain that lanterns were not used in conjunction with Moon-worship prior to the Tang dynasty. Traditionally, the lantern has been used to symbolize fertility, and functioned mainly as a toy and decoration. But today the lantern has come to symbolize the festival itself. In the old days, lanterns were made in the image of natural things, myths, and local cultures. Over time, a greater variety of lanterns could be found as local cultures became influenced by their neighbors.

As China gradually evolved from an agrarian society to a mixed agrarian-commercial one, traditions from other festivals began to be transmitted into the Mid-Autumn Festival, such as the putting of lanterns on rivers to guide the spirits of the drowned as practiced during the Ghost Festival, which is observed a month before. Hong Kong fishermen during the Qing dynasty, for example, would put up lanterns on their boats for the Ghost Festival and keep the lanterns up until Mid-Autumn Festival.

=== Mooncakes ===
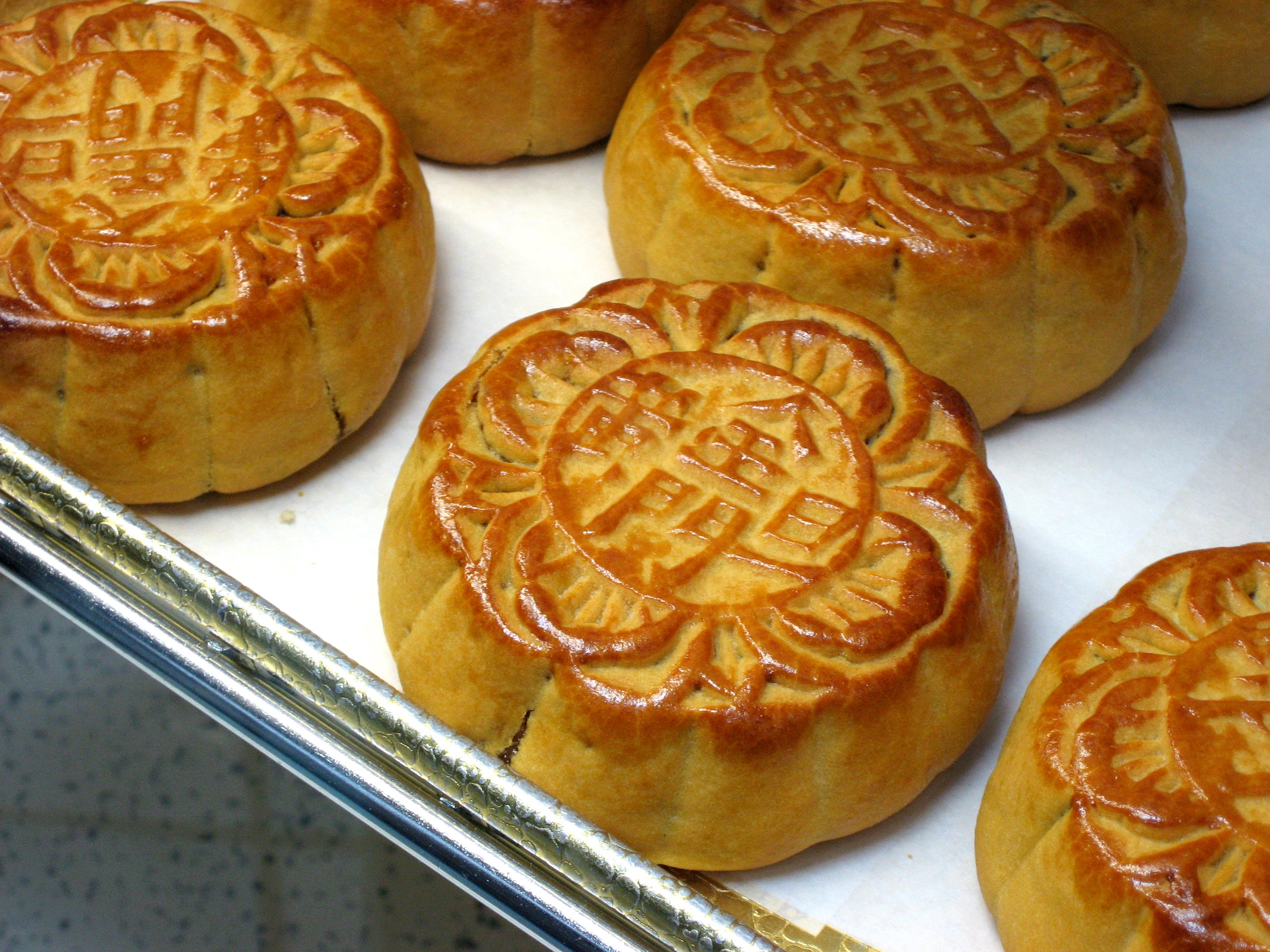
Typical lotus bean-filled mooncakes eaten during the festival

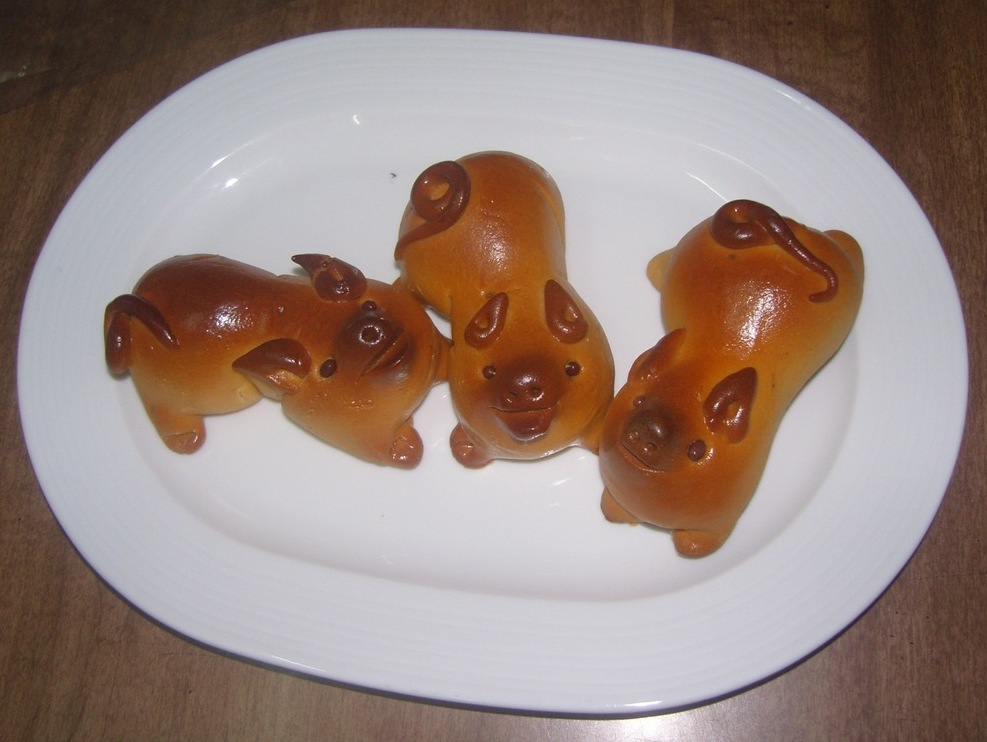
Animal-shaped mooncakes in Vietnam

Making and sharing mooncakes is one of the hallmark traditions of this festival. In Chinese culture, a round shape symbolizes completeness and reunion. Thus, the sharing and eating of round mooncakes among family members during the week of the festival signifies the completeness and unity of families. In some areas of China, there is a tradition of making mooncakes during the night of the Mid-Autumn Festival. The senior person in that household would cut the mooncakes into pieces and distribute them to each family member, signifying family reunion. In modern times, however, making mooncakes at home has given way to the more popular custom of giving mooncakes to family members, although the meaning of maintaining familial unity remains.

Although typical mooncakes can be around a few centimetres in diameter, imperial chefs have made some as large as 8 meters in diameter, with its surface pressed with designs of Chang'e, cassia trees, or the Moon-Palace. One tradition is to pile 13 mooncakes on top of each other to mimic a pagoda, the number 13 being chosen to represent the 13 months in a full Chinese lunisolar year. The spectacle of making very large mooncakes continues in modern China.

According to Chinese folklore, a Turpan businessman offered cakes to Emperor Taizong of Tang in his victory against the Xiongnu on the fifteenth day of the eighth Chinese lunisolar month. Taizong took the round cakes and pointed to the moon with a smile, saying, "I'd like to invite the toad to enjoy the hú (胡) cake." After sharing the cakes with his ministers, the custom of eating these hú cakes spread throughout the country. Eventually these became known as mooncakes. Although the legend explains the beginnings of mooncake-giving, its popularity and ties to the festival began during the Song dynasty (906–1279 CE).

Another popular legend concerns the Han Chinese's uprising against the ruling Mongols at the end of the Yuan dynasty (1280–1368 CE), in which the Han Chinese used traditional mooncakes to conceal the message that they were to rebel on Mid-Autumn Day. Because of strict controls upon Han Chinese families imposed by the Mongols in which only 1 out of every 10 households was allowed to own a knife guarded by a Mongolian, this coordinated message was important to gather as many available weapons as possible.

=== Other foods and food displays ===
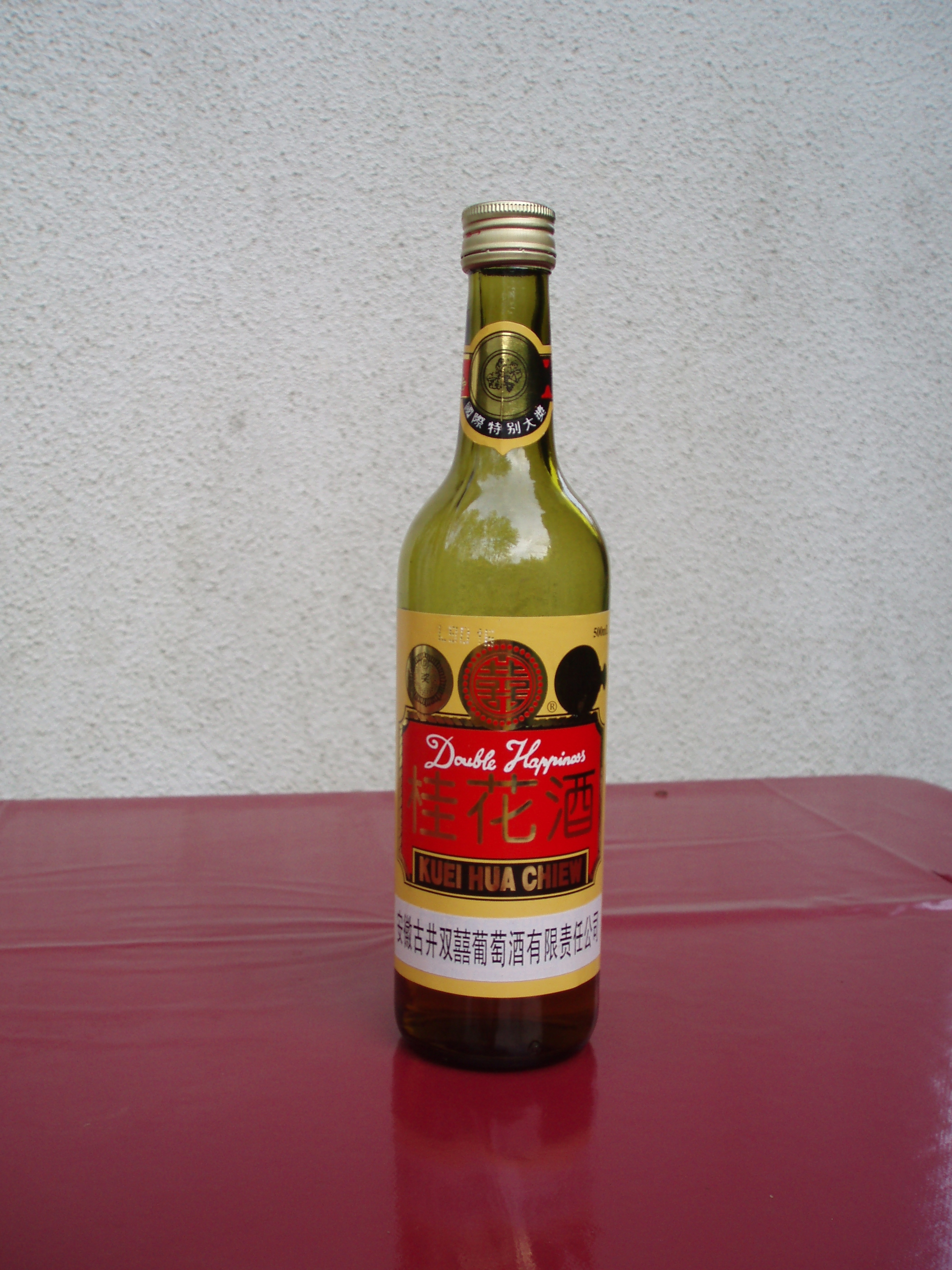
Cassia wine is the traditional choice for "reunion wine" drunk during Mid-Autumn Festival

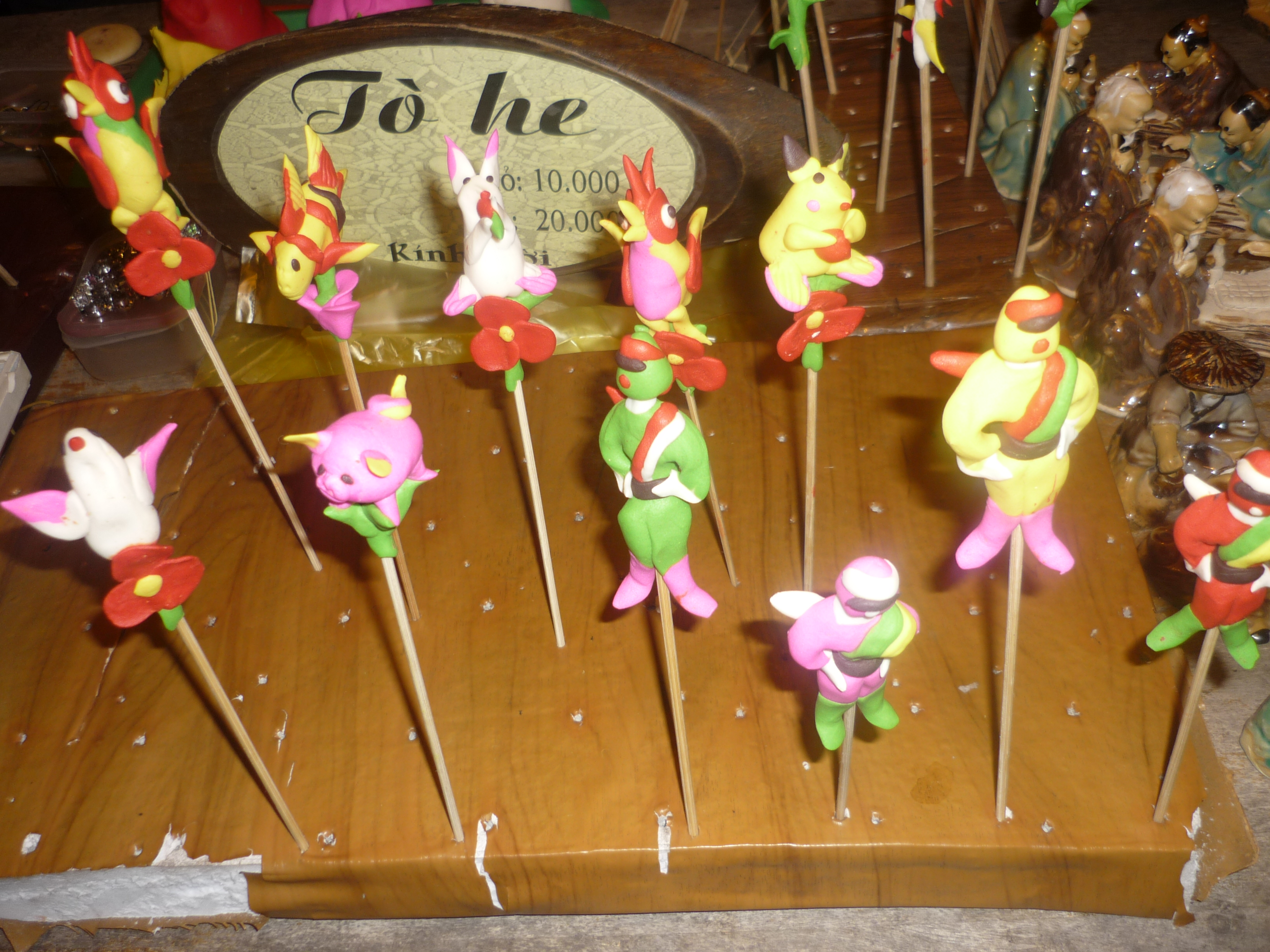
Vietnamese rice figurines, known as tò he

Imperial dishes served on this occasion included nine-jointed lotus roots which symbolize peace, and watermelons cut in the shape of lotus petals which symbolize reunion. Teacups were placed on stone tables in the garden, where the family would pour tea and chat, waiting for the moment when the full moon's reflection appeared in the center of their cups. Owing to the timing of the plant's blossoms, cassia wine is the traditional choice for the "reunion wine" drunk on the occasion. Also, people will celebrate by eating cassia cakes and candy. In some places, people will celebrate by drinking osmanthus wine and eating osmanthus mooncakes.

Food offerings made to deities are placed on an altar set up in the courtyard, including apples, pears, peaches, grapes, pomegranates, melons, oranges, and pomelos. One of the first decorations purchased for the celebration table is a clay statue of the Jade Rabbit. In Chinese folklore, the Jade Rabbit was an animal that lived on the Moon and accompanied Chang'e. Offerings of soy beans and cockscomb flowers were made to the Jade Rabbit.

Nowadays, in Southern China, people will also eat some seasonal fruit that may differ in different district but carrying the same meaning of blessing.

=== Courtship and matchmaking ===
The Mid-Autumn moon has traditionally been a choice occasion to celebrate marriages. Girls would pray to Moon deity Chang'e to help fulfill their romantic wishes.

In some parts of China, dances are held for young men and women to find partners. For example, young women are encouraged to throw their handkerchiefs to the crowd, and the young man who catches and returns the handkerchief has a chance at romance. In Daguang, in southwest Guizhou Province, young men and women of the Dong people would make an appointment at a certain place. The young women would arrive early to overhear remarks made about them by the young men. The young men would praise their lovers in front of their fellows, in which finally the listening women would walk out of the thicket. Pairs of lovers would go off to a quiet place to open their hearts to each other.

=== Games and activities ===
During the 1920s and 1930s, ethnographer Chao Wei-pang conducted research on traditional games among men, women and children on or around the Mid-Autumn day in the Guangdong Province. These games relate to flights of the soul, spirit possession, or fortunetelling.

- One type of activity, "Ascent to Heaven" (Chinese: 上天堂 shàng tiāntáng) involves a young lady selected from a circle of women to "ascend" into the celestial realm. While being enveloped in the smoke of burning incense, she describes the beautiful sights and sounds she encounters.
- Another activity, "Descent into the Garden" (Chinese: 落花园 luò huāyuán), played among younger girls, detailed each girl's visit to the heavenly gardens. According to legend, a flower tree represented her, and the number and color of the flowers indicated the sex and number of children she would have in her lifetime.
- Men played a game called "Descent of the Eight Immortals" (jiangbaxian), where one of the Eight Immortals took possession of a player, who would then assume the role of a scholar or warrior.
- Children would play a game called "Encircling the Toad" (guanxiamo), where the group would form a circle around a child chosen to be a Toad King and chanted a song that transformed the child into a toad. He would jump around like a toad until water was sprinkled on his head, in which he would then stop.

=== Local celebrations ===
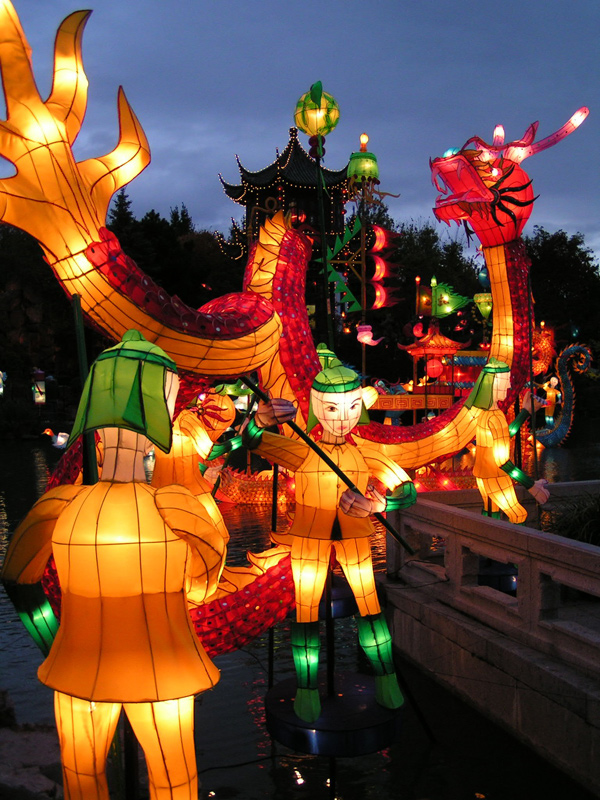
Mid-Autumn Festival at the Botanical Garden, Montreal

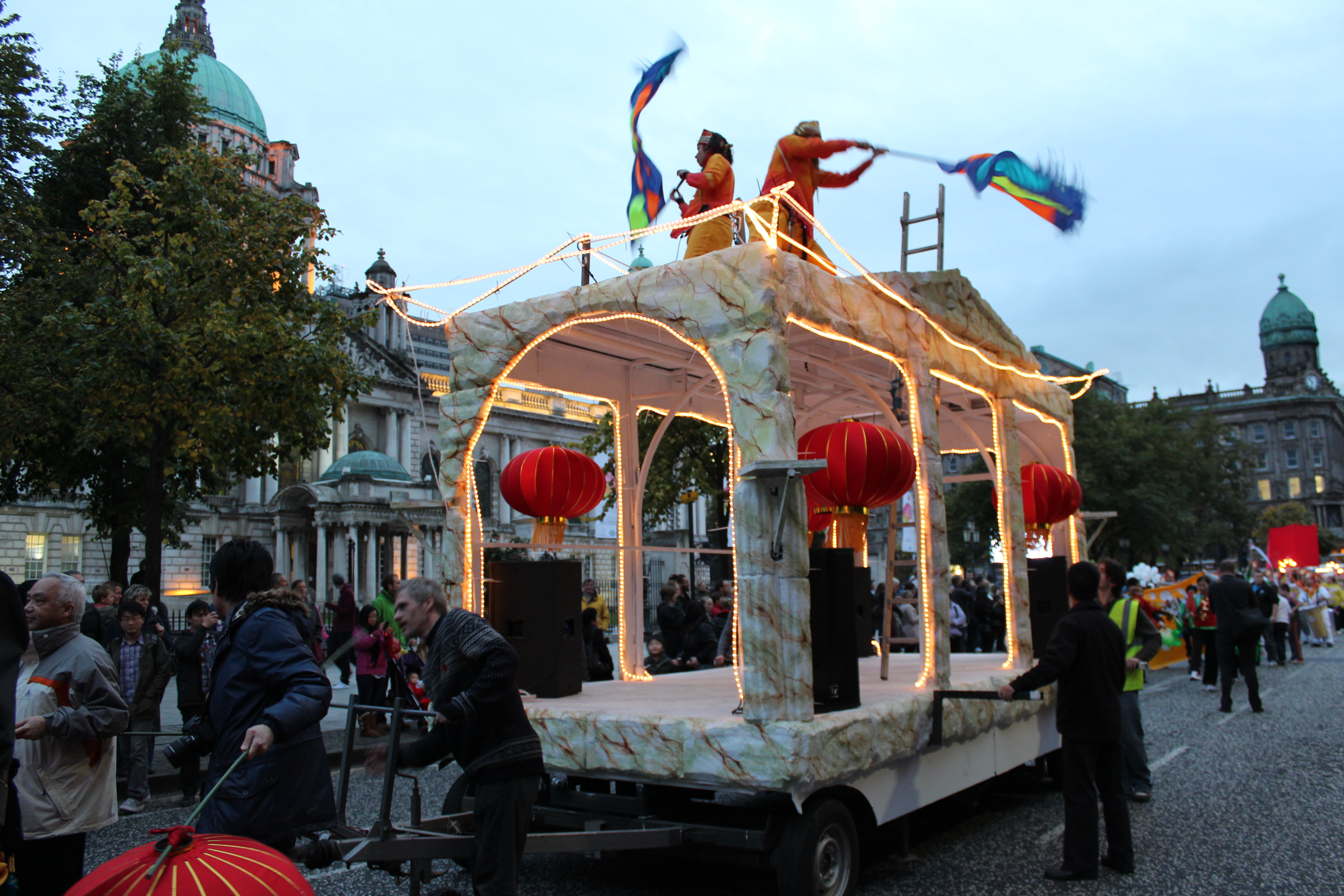
Chinese Mid-Autumn Festival parade, Belfast City Hall, Belfast, Northern Ireland

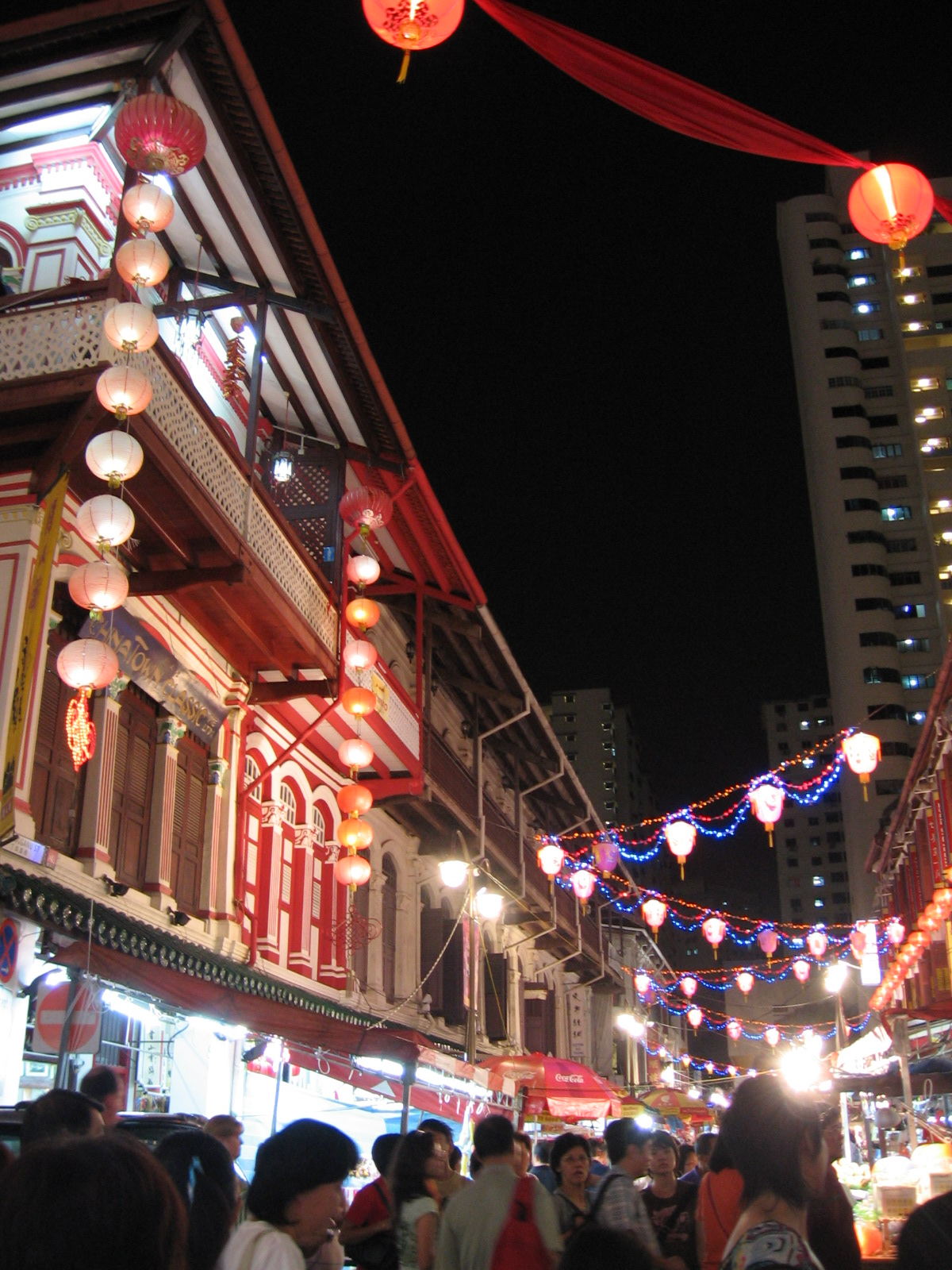
Mid-Autumn Festival at Chinatown, Singapore

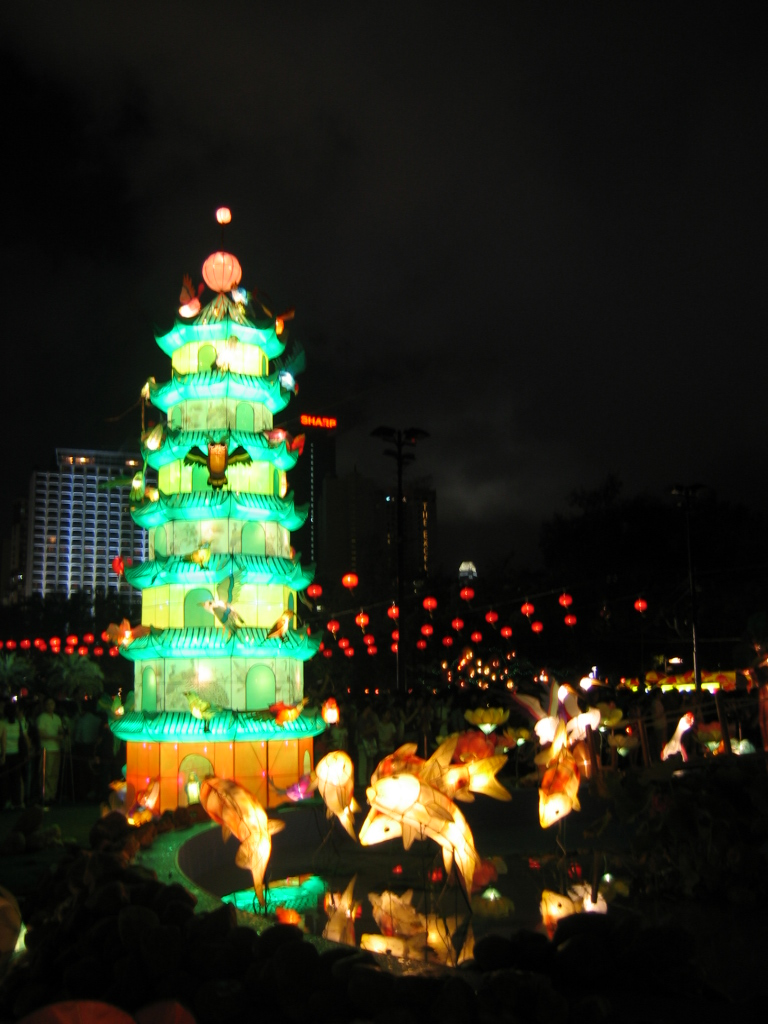
Mid-Autumn Festival celebrations in Victoria Park, Hong Kong

==== Xiamen ====
A unique tradition is celebrated quite exclusively in the island city of Xiamen. During the festival, families and friends gather to play Bo Bing, a traditional dice-based prize game associated with the Mid-Autumn Festival. People take turns in rolling the dice in a ceramic bowl with the results determining what they win. The number 4 is mainly what determines how big the prize is.

==== Hong Kong and Macau ====
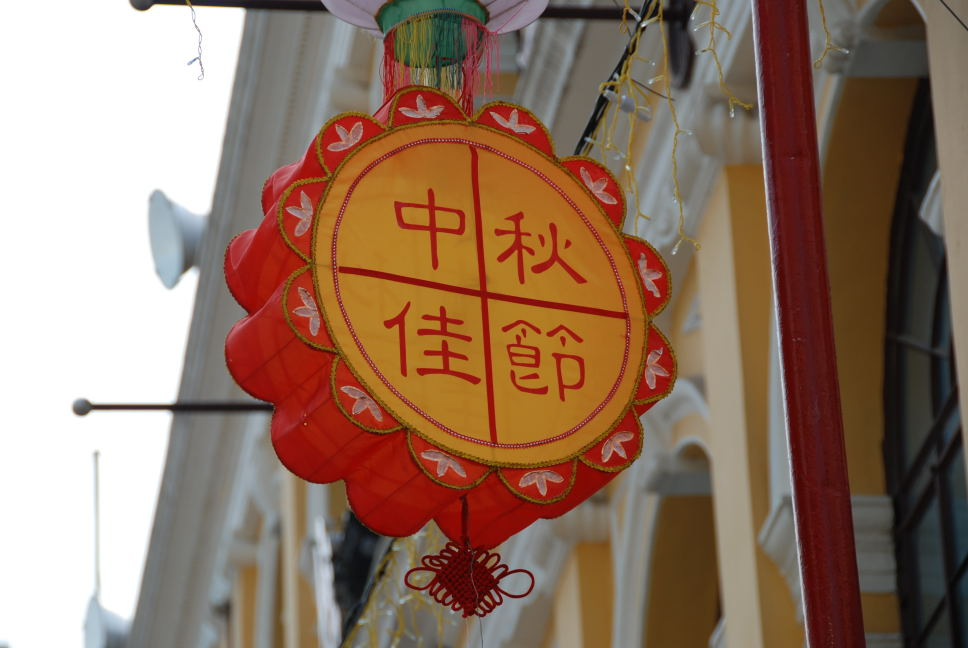
Lantern in Senado Square, Macau

In Hong Kong and Macau, the day after the Mid-Autumn Festival is a public holiday rather than the festival date itself (unless that date falls on a Sunday, then Monday is also a holiday), because many celebration events are held at night. Many businesses let employees off early on the day before. There are a number of festive activities such as lighting lanterns, but mooncakes are the most important feature there. However, people don't usually buy mooncakes for themselves, but to give their relatives as presents. People start to exchange these presents well in advance of the festival. Hence, mooncakes are sold in elegant boxes for presentation purpose. Also, the price for these boxes are not considered cheap—a four-mooncake box of the lotus seeds paste with egg yolks variety, can generally cost US$40 or more. However, as environmental protection has become a concern of the public in recent years, many mooncake manufacturers in Hong Kong have adopted practices to reduce packaging materials to practical limits. The mooncake manufacturers also explore in the creation of new types of mooncakes, such as ice-cream mooncake and snow skin mooncake.

There are also other traditions related to the Mid-Autumn Festival in Hong Kong. Neighbourhoods across Hong Kong set impressive lantern exhibitions with traditional stage shows, game stalls, palm readings, and many other festive activities. The grandest celebrations take place in Victoria Park (Hong Kong). One of the brightest rituals is the Fire Dragon Dance dating back to the 19th century and recognised as a part of China's intangible cultural heritage. The 200 foot-long fire dragon requires more than 300 people to operate, taking turns. The leader of the fire dragon dance would pray for peace, good fortune through blessings in Hakka. After the ritual ceremony, fire-dragon was thrown into the sea with lanterns and paper cards, which means the dragon would return to sea and take the misfortunes away.

Before 1941, there were also some celebration of Mid-Autumn Festival held in small villages in Hong Kong. Sha Po would celebrate Mid Autumn Festival in every 15th day of the 8th Chinese lunisolar month. People called the Mid-Autumn Festival the Kwong Sin Festival. They held Pok San Ngau Tsai at Datong Pond in Sha Po. Pok San Ngau Tsai was a celebration event of the Kwong Sin Festival, and people would gather around to watch it. During the event, someone would play the percussions, and some villagers would then act possessed and call themselves "Maoshan Masters". They burnt themselves with incense sticks and fought with real blades and spears.

==== Ethnic minorities in mainland China ====
- Korean minorities living in Yanbian Korean Autonomous Prefecture have a custom of welcoming the Moon; where they put up a large conical house frame made of dry pine branches called a "moon house". The moonlight would shine inside for gazers to appreciate.
- The Bouyei people call the occasion "Worshipping Moon Festival", where after praying to ancestors and dining together, they bring rice cakes to the doorway to worship the Moon Grandmother.
- The Tu people practice a ceremony called "Beating the Moon", where they place a basin of clear water in the courtyard to reflect an image of the Moon, and then "beat" the water surface with branches.
- The Maonan people tie a bamboo near the table, on which a grapefruit is hung, with three lit incense sticks on it. This is called "Shooting the Moon".

==== Taiwan ====
In Taiwan, the Mid-Autumn Festival is a public holiday. Outdoor barbecues (Chinese: 烤肉; Tâi-lô: Hang-bah) have become a popular affair for friends and family to gather and enjoy each other's company. Children also make and wear hats made of pomelo rinds. It is believed Chang'e, the lady in the moon, will notice children with her favorite fruit and bestow good fortune upon them.

==== Canada and the United States ====
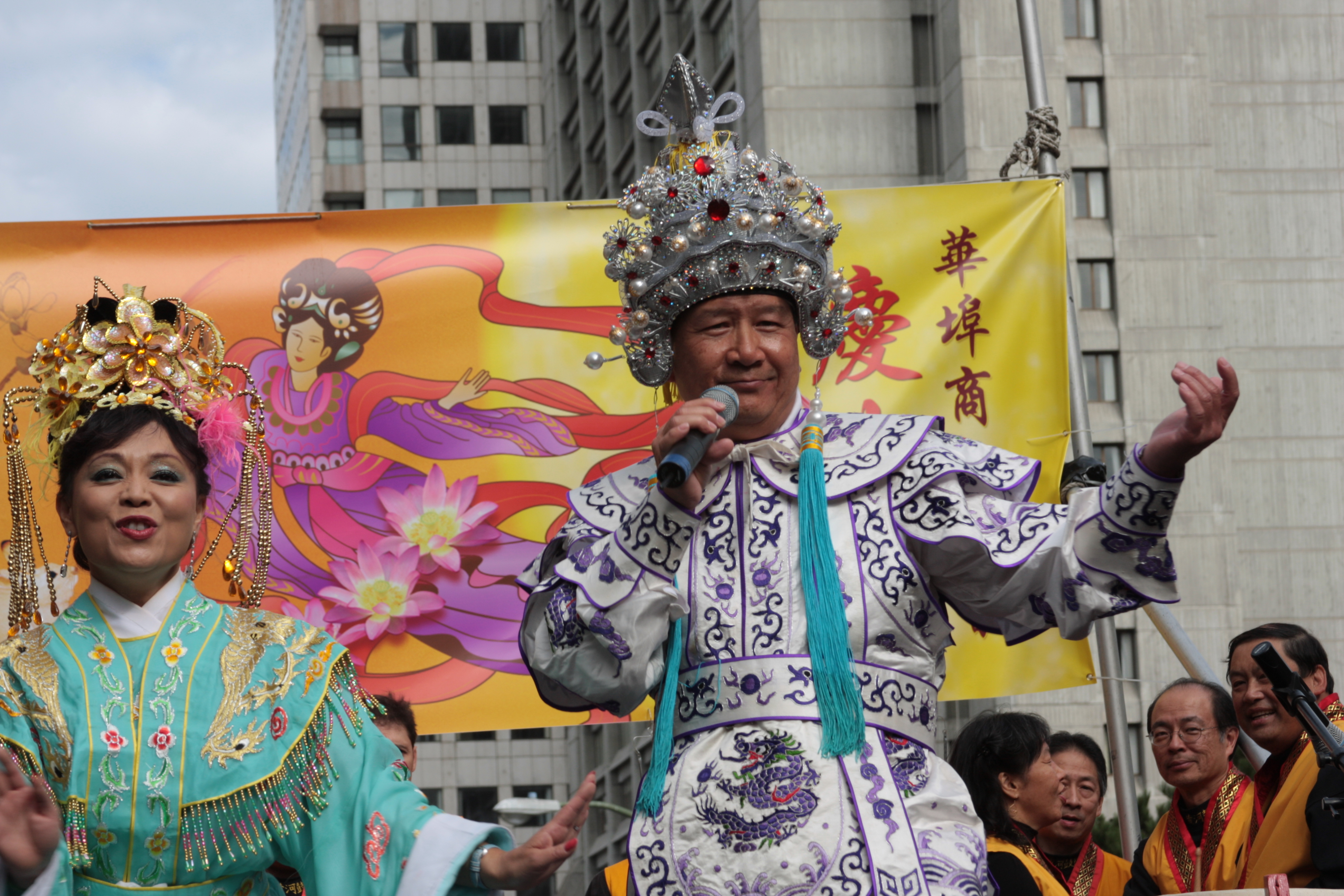
Autumn Moon Festival in San Francisco Chinatown, 2007

As late as 2014, the Mid-Autumn Festival generally went unnoticed in North America outside of Asian supermarkets and food stores, but it has gained popularity since then in areas with significant ethnic Chinese overseas populations, such as New York, Chicago, Los Angeles, and San Francisco. Unlike traditions in China, celebrations in the United States are usually limited to daylight hours, and generally conclude by early evening.

Mid-Autumn Festivals in North America
City	District	Since	Ref.
Boston	Chinatown, Boston		
Chicago	Chinatown, Chicago	2005	
Los Angeles	Chinatown, Los Angeles	1938	
New York City	Chinatown, Manhattan, Flushing, Queens, and Sunset Park	2019	
Philadelphia	Chinatown, Philadelphia	1995	
San Francisco	Chinatown, San Francisco	1991	
Toronto	Cadillac Fairview shopping areas		
Vancouver	Dr. Sun Yat-Sen Classical Chinese Garden		

== Similar holidays in other cultures ==
Similar harvest holidays are found in other parts of Asia and also revolve around the full moon. These festivals tend to occur on the same day or around the Mid-Autumn Festival.

=== East Asia ===
==== Japan ====
The Japanese moon viewing festival, o-tsukimi (お月見, "moon viewing"), is also held at this time. People picnic and drink sake under the full moon to celebrate the harvest.

==== Korea ====
Chuseok (Korean: 추석; Hanja: 秋夕; [tɕʰu.sʌk̚]), literally "Autumn eve", once known as hangawi (한가위; [han.ɡa.ɥi]; from archaic Korean for "the great middle (of autumn)"), is a major harvest festival and a three-day holiday in North Korea and South Korea celebrated on the 15th day of the 8th month of the Chinese lunisolar calendar on the full moon. It was celebrated as far back as during the Three Kingdoms period in Silla. As a celebration of the good harvest, Koreans visit their ancestral hometowns, honor their ancestors in a family ceremony (차례), and share a feast of Korean traditional food such as songpyeon (송편), tohrangook (토란국), and rice wines such as sindoju and dongdongju.

=== Southeast Asia ===
Many festivals revolving around a full moon are also celebrated in Cambodia, Laos, and Myanmar. Like the Mid-Autumn Festival, these festivals have Buddhist origins and revolve around the full moon. However, unlike their East Asian counterparts they occur several times a year to correspond with each full moon as opposed to one day each year. The festivals that occur in the lunar months of Ashvini and Kṛttikā generally occur during the Mid-Autumn Festival.

==== Cambodia ====
In Cambodia, it is more commonly called "The Water and Moon Festival" Bon Om Touk. The Water and Moon festival is celebrated in November of every year. It is a three-day celebration, starting with the boat race that last the first two days of the festival. The boat races are colorfully painted with bright colors and is in various designs being most popular the neak, Cambodian sea dragon. Hundreds of Cambodian males take part in rowing the boats and racing them at the Tonle Sap River. When night falls the streets are filled with people buying food and attending various concerts. In the evening is the Sampeah Preah Khae: the salutation to the moon or prayers to the moon. The Cambodian people set an array of offerings that are popular for rabbits, such and various fruits and a traditional dish called Ak Ambok in front of their homes with lit incenses to make wishes to the Moon. Cambodians believe the legend of The Rabbit and the Moon, and that a rabbit who lives on the Moon watches over the Cambodian people. At midnight everyone goes up to the temple to pray and make wishes and enjoy their Ak Ambok together. Cambodians would also make homemade lanterns that are usually made into the shape of the lotus flowers or other more modern designs. Incense and candles light up the lanterns and Cambodians make prayers and then send if off into the river for their wishes and prayers to be heard and granted.

==== Laos ====
In Laos, many festivals are held on the day of the full moon. The most popular festival known as That Luang Festival is associated with Buddhist legend and is held at Pha That Luang temple in Vientiane. The festival often lasts for three to seven days. A procession occurs and many people visit the temple.

==== Myanmar ====
In Myanmar, numerous festivals are held on the day of the full moon. However, the Thadingyut Festival is the most popular one and occurs in the month of Thadingyut. It also occurs around the time of the Mid-Autumn Festival, depending on the lunar calendar. It is one of the biggest festivals in Myanmar after the New Year festival, Thingyan. It is a Buddhist festival and many people go to the temple to pay respect to the monks and offer food. It is also a time for thanksgiving and paying homage to Buddhist monks, teachers, parents and elders.

==== Singapore ====
The mid-Autumn festival, known as Bulan Lapan by Peranakan Chinese, is informally observed, but is not a government or public holiday.

==== Vietnam ====
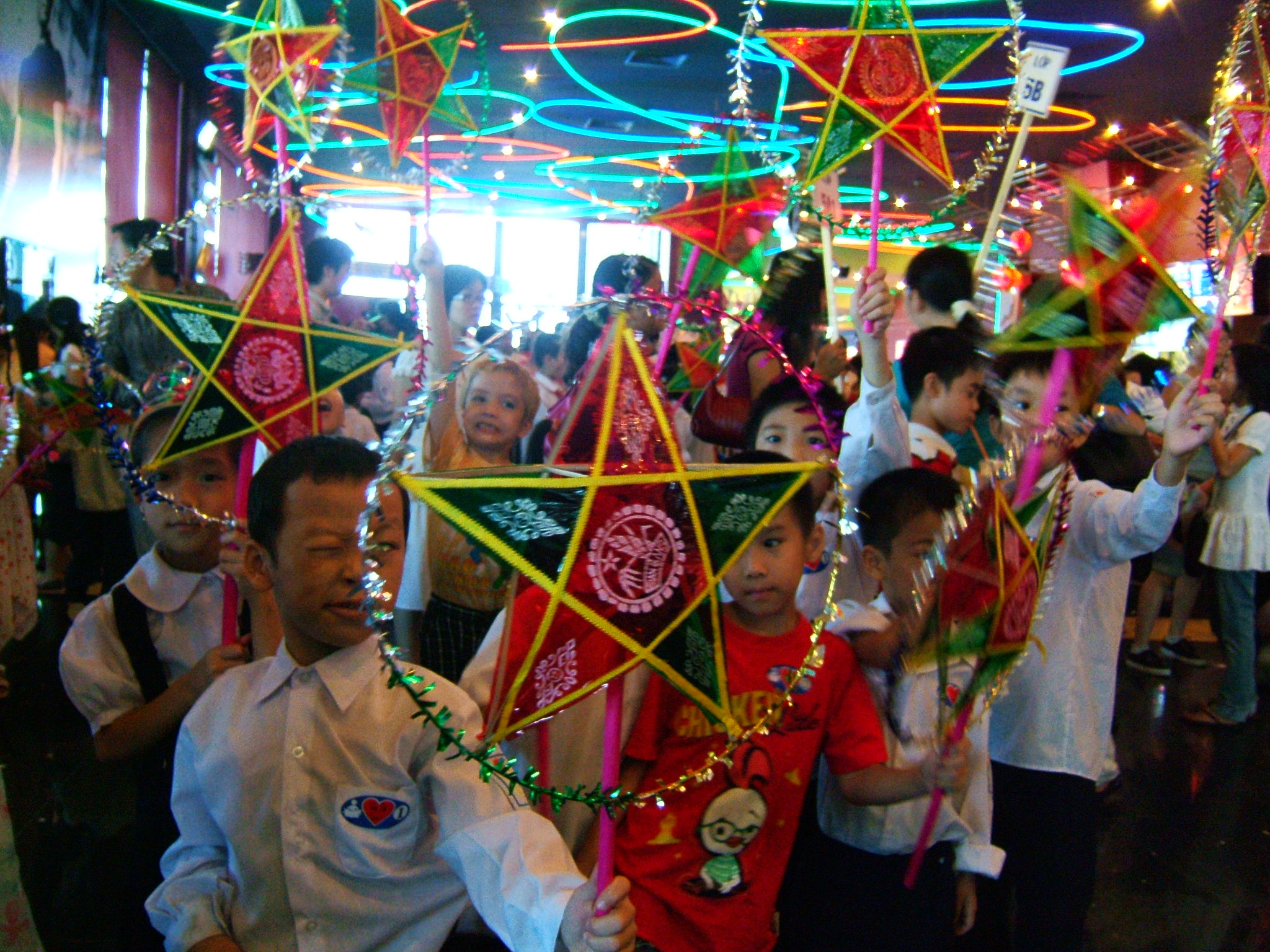
Vietnamese children celebrating the Tết Trung Thu with traditional 5-pointed star-shaped lantern

In Vietnam, children participate in parades in the dark under the full moon with lanterns of various forms, shapes, and colors. Traditionally, lanterns signified the wish for the Sun's light and warmth to return after winter. In addition to carrying lanterns, the children also don masks. Elaborate masks were made of papier-mâché, though it is more common to find masks made of plastic nowadays. Handcrafted shadow lanterns were an important part of Mid-Autumn displays since the 12th-century Lý dynasty, often of historical figures from Vietnamese history. Handcrafted lantern-making declined in modern times due to the availability of mass-produced plastic lanterns, which often depict internationally recognizable characters from children's shows and video games.

The Mid-Autumn Festival is known as Tết Trung Thu (Chữ Nôm: 節中秋) in Vietnamese. It is also commonly referred to as the "Children's Festival". The Vietnamese traditionally believed that children, being the most innocent, had the closest connection to the sacred, pure and natural beauty of the world. The celebration of the children's spirit was seen as a way to connect to that world still full of wonder, mystery, teachings, joy, and sadness. Animist spirits, deities and Vietnamese folk religions are also observed during the festival.

In its most traditional form, the evening commemorates the dragon who brings rain for the crops. Celebrants would observe the moon to divine the future of the people and the harvests. Eventually the celebration came to symbolize a reverence for fruitfulness, with prayers given for bountiful harvests, increase in livestock, and fertility. Over time, the prayers for children evolved into the celebration of children. Historical Confucian scholars continued the tradition of gazing at the Moon, but to sip wine and improvise poetry and song. However, by the early twentieth century in Hanoi, the festival had begun to assume its identity as the quintessential children's festival.

Aside from the story of Chang'e (Vietnamese: Hằng Nga), there are two other popular folktales associated with the festival. The first describes the legend of Cuội, whose wife accidentally urinated on a sacred banyan tree. The tree began to float towards the Moon, and Cuội, trying to pull it back down to Earth, floated to the Moon with it, leaving him stranded there. Every year, during the Mid-Autumn Festival, children light lanterns and participate in a procession to show Cuội the way back to Earth. The other tale involves a carp who wanted to become a dragon, and as a result, worked hard throughout the year until he was able to transform himself into a dragon.

One important event before and during the festival are lion dances. Dances are performed by both non-professional children's groups and trained professional groups. Lion dance groups perform on the streets, going to houses asking for permission to perform for them. If the host consents, the "lion" will come in and start dancing as a blessing of luck and fortune for the home. In return, the host gives lucky money to show their gratitude. Cakes and fruits are not only consumed, but elaborately prepared as food displays. For example, glutinous rice flour and rice paste are molded into familiar animals. Pomelo sections can be fashioned into unicorns, rabbits, or dogs. Villagers of Xuân La, just north of Hanoi, produce tò he, figurines made from rice paste and colored with natural food dyes. Into the early decades of the twentieth century of Vietnam, daughters of wealthy families would prepare elaborate center pieces filled with treats for their younger siblings. Well-dressed visitors could visit to observe the daughter's handiwork as an indication of her capabilities as a wife in the future. Eventually the practice of arranging centerpieces became a tradition not just limited to wealthy families.

Into the early decades of the twentieth century Vietnam, young men and women used the festival as a chance to meet future life companions. Groups would assemble in a courtyard and exchange verses of song while gazing at the Moon. Those who performed poorly were sidelined until one young man and one young woman remained, after which they would win prizes as well as entertain matrimonial prospects.

=== South Asia ===
==== India ====
Onam is an annual Harvest festival in the state of Kerala in India. It falls on the 22nd nakshatra Thiruvonam in the Malayalam calendar month of Chingam, which in Gregorian calendar overlaps with August–September. According to legends, the festival is celebrated to commemorate King Mahabali, whose spirit is said to visit Kerala at the time of Onam.

Onam is a major annual event for Malayali people in and outside Kerala. It is a harvest festival, one of three major annual Hindu celebrations along with Vishu and Thiruvathira, and it is observed with numerous festivities. Onam celebrations include Vallam Kali (boat races), Pulikali (tiger dances), Pookkalam (flower Rangoli), Onathappan (worship), Onam Kali, Tug of War, Thumbi Thullal (women's dance), Kummattikali (mask dance), Onathallu (martial arts), Onavillu (music), Kazhchakkula (plantain offerings), Onapottan (costumes), Atthachamayam (folk songs and dance), and other celebrations.

Onam is the official state festival of Kerala with public holidays that start four days from Uthradom (Onam eve). Major festivities take place across 30 venues in Thiruvananthapuram, capital of Kerala. It is also celebrated by Malayali diaspora around the world. Though a Hindu festival, non-Hindu communities of Kerala participate in Onam celebrations considering it as a cultural festival.

Sharad Purnima is a harvest festival celebrated on the full moon day of the Hindu lunar month of Ashvin (September–October), marking the end of the monsoon season.

==== Sri Lanka ====
In Sri Lanka, a full moon day is known as Poya and each full moon day is a public holiday. Shops and businesses are closed on these days as people prepare for the full moon. Exteriors of buildings are adorned with lanterns and people often make food and go to the temple to listen to sermons. The Binara Full Moon Poya Day and Vap Full Moon Poya Day occur around the time of the Mid-Autumn Festival and like other Buddhist Asian countries, the festivals celebrate the ascendance and culmination of the Buddha's visit to heaven and for the latter, the acknowledgement of the cultivation season known as "Maha".

=== West Asia ===
==== Israel ====
The Jewish harvest festival of Sukkot is a cognate celebration. It begins on a full moon, on the fifteenth day of the lunar month Tishrei, which is the seventh month of the Hebrew calendar. Because of similarities between this calendar and the Chinese calendar, this often coincides with the Mid-Autumn Festival. Sukkot is also known in the Torah as "Festival of Ingathering" (Hebrew: חַג הָאָסִיף, romanized: ḥag hāʾāsif), similar to the element of gathering in the Chinese Mid-Autumn Festival. This "gathering" refers both to the end of harvest and to the gathering of people into the Sukkah.

== Dates ==
The Mid-Autumn Festival is held on the 15th day of the eighth month in the Han calendar—essentially the night of a full moon—which falls near the Autumnal Equinox (on a day between 7 September and 8 October in the Gregorian calendar). It will occur on these days in the coming years:

- 2026: Friday 25 September
- 2027: Wednesday 15 September
- 2028: Tuesday 3 October
- 2029: Saturday 22 September
- 2030: Thursday 12 September

== See also ==
- Agriculture in China
- Agriculture in Vietnam
- Chinese holidays
- Dragon Boat Festival – Chinese holiday
- Joss paper – Sheets of paper made into burnt offerings in Chinese culture
- List of harvest festivals
- Vietnamese holidays
