= Osmanthus wine =

Chinese alcoholic beverage

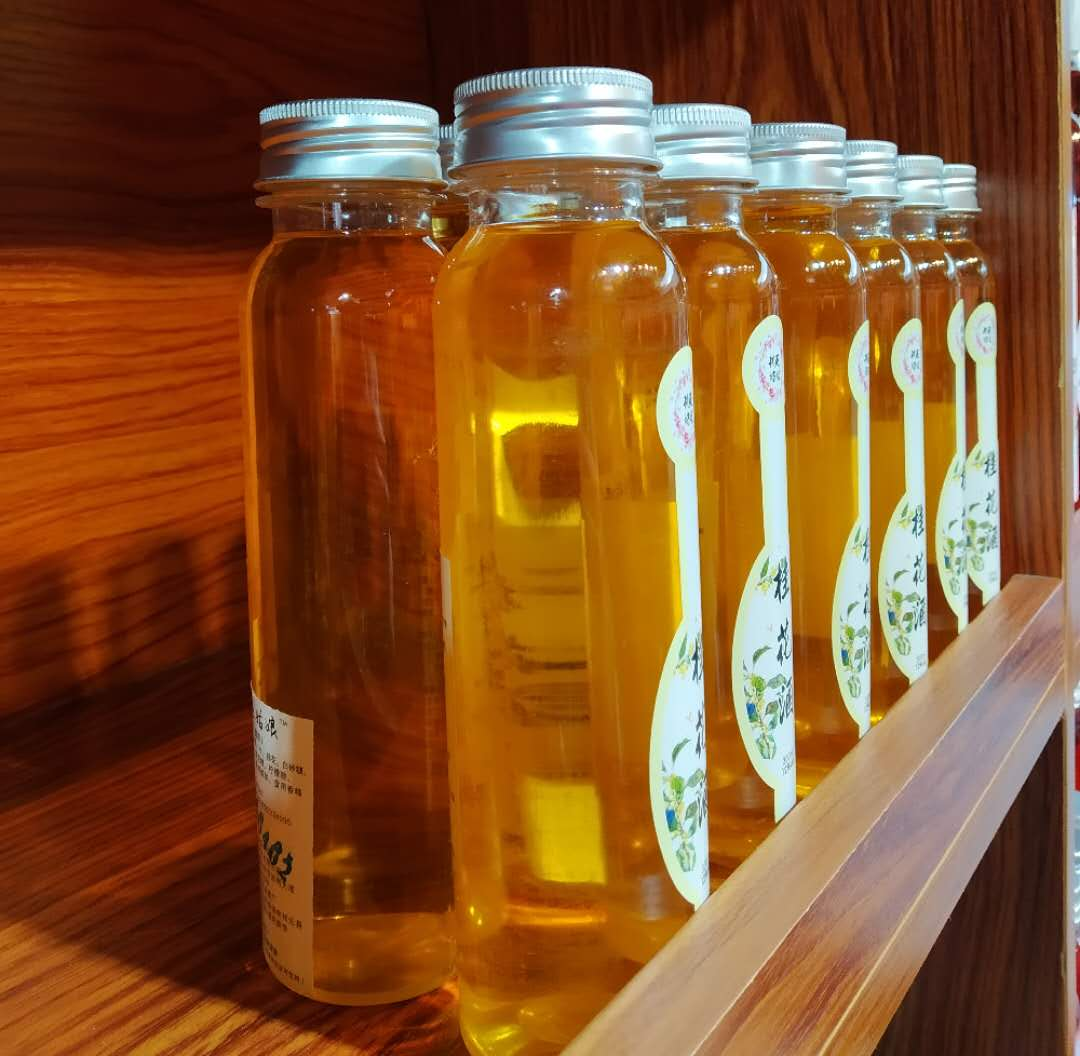
- Bottles of osmanthus wine
- Chinese: 桂花酒
Transcriptions
Standard Mandarin
- Hanyu Pinyin: guìhuājiǔ
- Wade–Giles: kuei-hua-chiu

Alternative Chinese name
- Chinese: 桂酒
Transcriptions
Standard Mandarin
- Hanyu Pinyin: guìjiǔ
- Wade–Giles: kuei-chiu

Aged osmanthus wine
- Traditional Chinese: 桂花陳酒
- Simplified Chinese: 桂花陈酒
- Postal: Kuei Hua Chen Chiew
- Literal meaning: Osmanthus reserve wine
Transcriptions
Standard Mandarin
- Hanyu Pinyin: guìhuā chénjiǔ
- Wade–Giles: kuei-hua ch'en-chiu

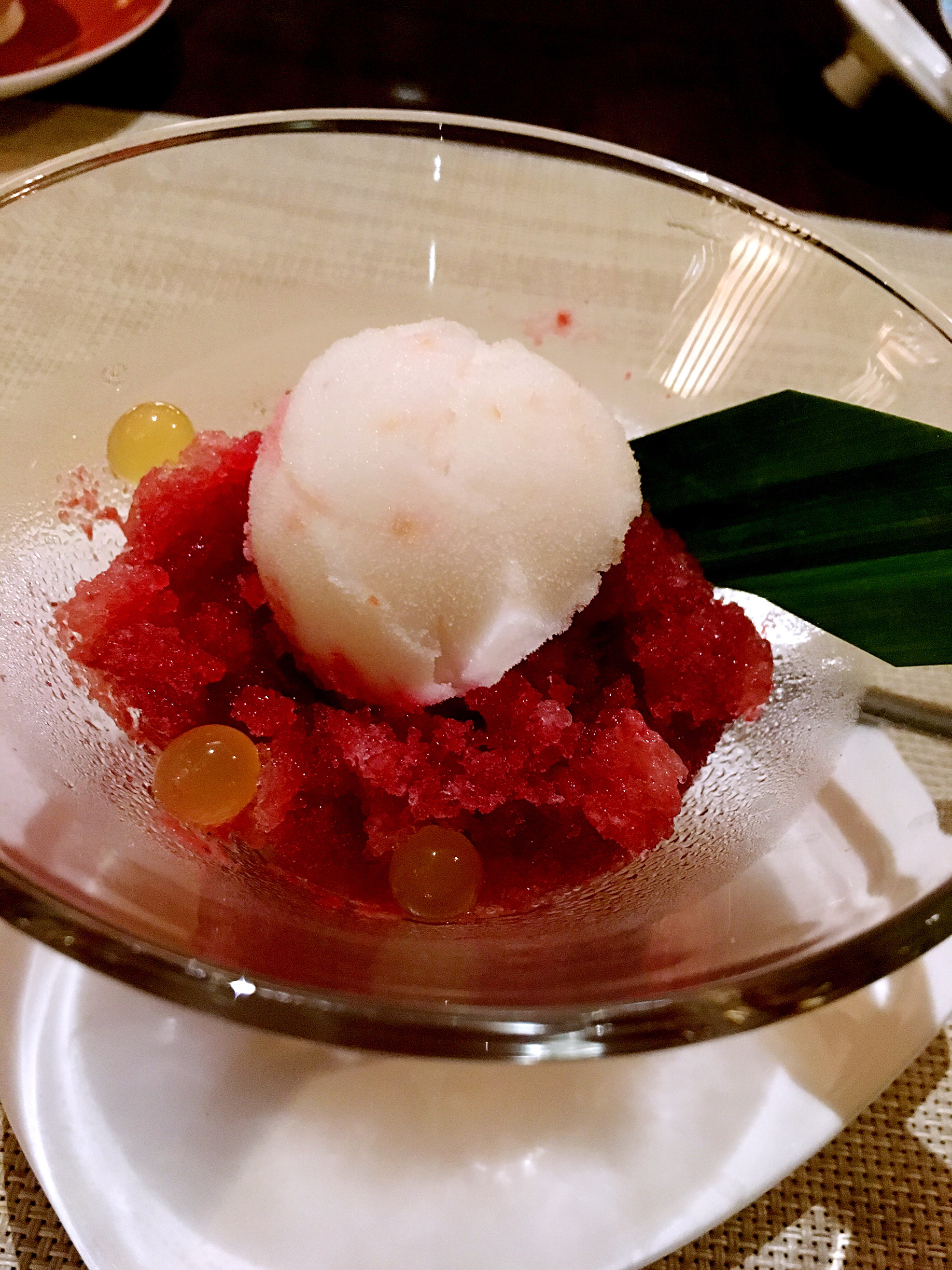
A dessert made of Nu Er Hong and Kuei Hua Chen Chiew Cocktail Jelly

Osmanthus wine, also known as cassia wine or Kuei Hua Chen Chiew, is a Chinese alcoholic beverage produced from weak baijiu and flavored with sweet osmanthus (Osmanthus fragrans) flowers. It is distilled but typically has an alcohol content less than 20%.

While the plant itself is sometimes associated with cinnamon, the blossoms' lactones impart a flavor closer to apricots and peaches.

Owing to the time at which Osmanthus fragrans flowers, 'cassia' wine is the traditional choice for the "reunion wine" drunk during the Mid-Autumn Festival. Because of the homophony between 酒 ("alcohol") and 久 ("long", in the sense of time passing), osmanthus wine is also a traditional gift for birthdays in China. It is also considered a medicinal wine in traditional Chinese medicine. Li Shizhen's Compendium of Materia Medica credits sweet osmanthus with "curing the hundred diseases" and "raising the spirit".

Within China, osmanthus wine is associated with Xi'an and Guizhou, but production now occurs throughout China, including Beijing and at the Hong Jiang Winery in Hunan.

== In popular culture ==
While the wine is also frequently referenced in Chinese period dramas (often referred to as Xianxia or Wuxia), it has also been referenced many times in the game Genshin Impact as the favorite beverage of the character Zhongli.
