= Xuân La, Hanoi =

Archaeological site in Vietnam

Coordinates: 21°03′56″N 105°48′19″E

Xuân La is an archaeological site in Tây Hồ District of Hanoi, near ancient Hà Đông in the Red River Delta in northern Vietnam. Excavations there yielded a number of coffins containing relics of the Bronze Age Đông Sơn culture.

Xuan La is located only a short distance of 10 km from Châu Can, both formerly in Hà Tây Province. The seven coffins excavated at the site were uncovered in 1982 and show a basic level of similarity to those at Chau Can, but with some difficulties, according to a report by Vietnamese archaeologists Pham Quoc Quan and Trinh Can.

== Discovery ==
The discovery of Chinese coins of Wang Mang in the area, led archaeologists to conclude that the burial site must have been during or after the Xin dynasty which was in existence from 9 CE to 23 CE.

The burial style of the coffins found at Xuan La are similar to that of Chau Can, with the body typically being placed in a wooden coffin with the burial goods being placed beside the body, beside the deceased's ankles and beyond the skull. A wide variety of wooden objects was also found among the buried coffins, which wooden sculptures of human figures being found.

Burial 1 was unearthed with a wooden tray in the ankle region, in addition to the presence of two bronze socketed axe head, three axe hafts, a wooden stick and a shaft of bamboo. Four pottery objects and 36 Chinese coins were found next to the left hand.

In burial, the skull was placed on a bronze vessel and a wooden sculpture of a human had been placed beside the left shoulder of the deceased. A large wooden tray of circular shape was placed over the knees of the dead, alongside which stood a bronze thap vase-like object. The vessel was 22 cm tall and was decorated with three rows of spiral and geometric patterns. A socketed pediform axe made of bronze was placed beside the left hand of the dead.

Burial 3 included three small ring-footed pottery vessels inside the coffin. Three more such vessels were placed outside the coffin in front of the position of the head. The head of the deceased was placed on a group of socketed iron spades, which were almost identical to those found in Yingshanling. There were more such spades lying beside the left elbow for a total of nine such objects inside the coffin. A socketed bronze spearhead and another arrowhead were found next to the left hand and a wooden disk was placed between the kneecaps of the dead. A circular lacquered box was placed next to the right ankle.

In burial 4, nine iron spades and a variety of other artefacts such as a wooden axe haft, eight coins, three pottery vessels, a wooden disc, three wooden containers and axehead. A bronze bowl was also found next to the skull.

Although the site contained iron hoes and axes from the Iron Age that was preceded by the Bronze Age, and the site was dated to be late among the Dong Son Bronze Age sites, the amount of bronze, which is expected to increase as the Bronze Age developed, was much smaller than that found at Việt Khê. The site also lacks the variety of weaponry and ceremonial accoutrements found at other Dong Son sites. No drums, halberds, daggers or ploughshares were uncovered at the site, which lead scholars to believe that Xuan La was a provincial centre of the Đông Sơn civilisation, rather than an epicentre of culture and wealth.
