= Châu Can =

Archaeological site in Vietnam

Châu Can (Hà Tây) is an archaeological site in the Red River Delta in northern Vietnam. It was located in Hà Sơn Bình province when it was excavated in 1974, but in 1975 was reorganized into Hà Tây province. Excavations there yielded a number of coffins containing relics of the Bronze Age Đông Sơn culture (literally "East Mountain" culture).

== Discovery ==
Eight coffins were recovered, made from logs. Three of these were incomplete while two others were described by the archaeologists as being in a poor condition. The coffins were aligned in a row with the head oriented towards the south or southeast direction. This provides a contrast with the graves at Việt Khê, although radiocarbon dating estimated the artefacts to date to a period between 197 BCE and 530 BCE which is from a common time period to the site at Viet Khe.

The burials at Châu Can are less prolific numerically, compared to the Việt Khê artefacts, with a smaller number of buried goods. However, they exhibit an unusually high number of wooden artefacts. On the other hand, no bronze bells, drums or vessels were found intact. The artefacts were generally less decorated and the pots were more regular in shape, with less variation from the basic circular shape. The burials were also placed in smaller coffins, and the lack of bronze vessels and musical artefacts, leading to speculation by scholars that the settlement at Chau Can had fewer metallurgical tradesmen than were present at Việt Khê.

Burial 3 contained the remains of a human, believed to be female, who was buried alongside a spearhead in the coffin. The spearhead was placed at the right upper arm. A pediform bronze axe was mounted on its haft beside her right leg, while a wooden implement was placed beside her head and a wooden haft from a spear was placed next to the left leg. The remains of a material, believed to be the deceased's clothing, was found scattered on the torso.

Burial 4 contained the skeleton of a male, with a set of objects that were placed in the coffin on and around the ankle. These consisted of a wooden ladle, a pottery vessel and a clay tray and another bamboo object whose method of use was not clear to archaeologists.

Burial 6 had only a small amount of human bones, but a difference emerged in that the burial goods were placed at the end of the feet with fabric remains found over the vicinity of the head. In this coffin, a gourd ladle, wooden tray and a spherical pot were found.

Burial 7 was different again, with fabric remnants covering the chest and further pieces beyond the end of the legs. This time a spherical pot and a wooden tray were placed on the deceased's ankles.

Burial 8 contained a fragment of a wooden tray and a two-piece wooden object. One of the pieces slotted into the other, leading archaeologists to speculate that the two-piece object was some kind of hafting device. In this case, human remains lay under a fabric shroud.
