= Việt Khê =

- Commune
- Interactive map of Việt Khê
- Coordinates: 20.9769902°N 106.5991991°E
- Country: Vietnam
- Region: Red River Delta
- Municipality: Hai Phong
- Established: 16 June 2025
- Administrative headquarters: Phố Mới Hamlet

Area
  - Total: 30.98 km^{2} (11.96 sq mi)

Population (2025)
  - Total: 37,936
  - Density: 1,224/km^{2} (3,170/sq mi)
- Website: vietkhe.haiphong.gov.vn

Việt Khê is a commune in the municipality of Hai Phong, Vietnam.

On 16 June 2025, the Standing Committee of the National Assembly of Vietnam issued a resolution on the arrangement of commune-level administrative units in Hai Phong in 2025. Under the resolution, the entire area and population of Ninh Sơn Commune and part of Liên Xuân Commune were merged to form a new commune named Việt Khê.
