= Anha =

- Civil parish
- Location in Portugal
- Coordinates: 41.664°N 8.793°W
- Country: Portugal
- Region: Norte
- Intermunic. comm.: Alto Minho
- District: Viana do Castelo
- Municipality: Viana do Castelo

Area
  - Total: 9.40 km^{2} (3.63 sq mi)

Population (2011)
  - Total: 2,415
  - Density: 260/km^{2} (670/sq mi)
- Time zone: UTC+00:00 (WET)
  - Summer (DST): UTC+01:00 (WEST)

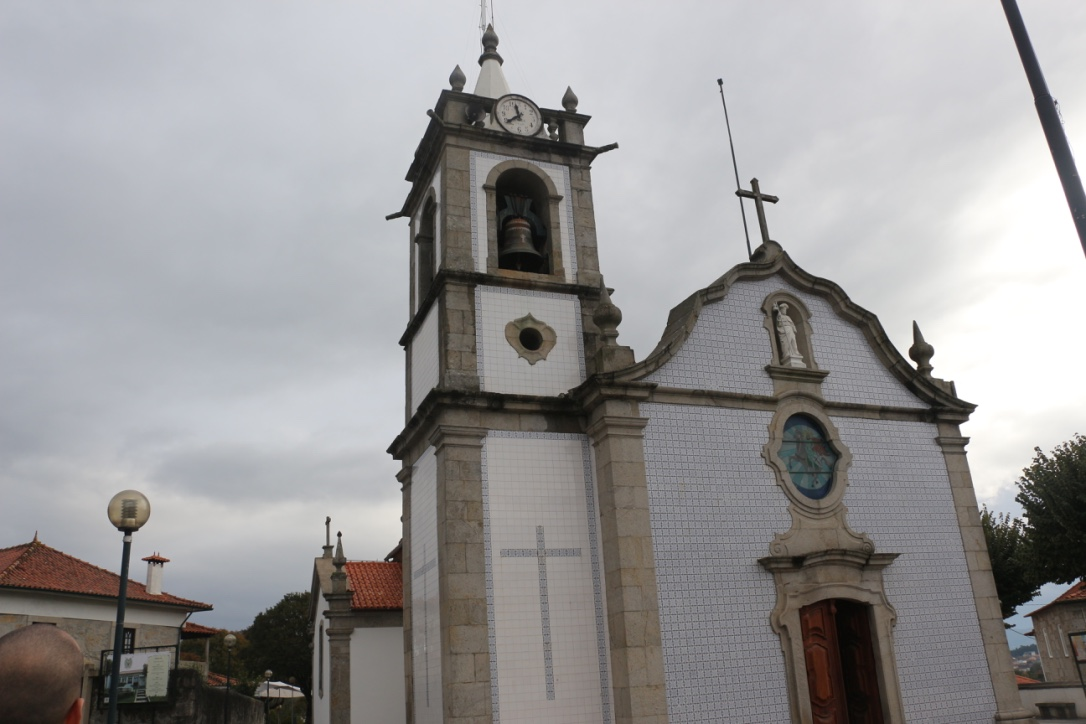
External view of the Igreja Matriz de Vila Nova de Anha

Anha or Vila Nova do Anha is a civil parish in the municipality of Viana do Castelo, Portugal. The population in 2011 was 2,415, in an area of 9.40 km^{2}. Town status was given in July 1985.

== Background ==
Anha is located south of Viana do Castelo, 4 km from the left bank of Lima River. The Faro mountain protects it from the North winds and it spreads over a valley of fertile land, crossed by the Anha stream, which debouches into the Atlantic Ocean. It is surrounded by Darque, to the north, Mazarefes and Vila Fria, to the east and Chafé, to the south.
