= João Vasco =

Portuguese footballer

Personal information
- Full name: João Vasco Lima Santos de Miranda
- Date of birth: 26 December 1994 (age 31)
- Place of birth: Darque, Portugal
- Height: 1.80 m (5 ft 11 in)
- Position: Forward

Youth career
- 2003–2012: Darquense
- 2012–2013: Vitorino Piães

Senior career*
Years	Team	Apps	(Gls)
2012	Darquense	3	(0)
2013	Vitorino Piães	1	(1)
2013–2014	Darquense	29	(7)
2014–2017	Mortágua	93	(17)
2017–2019	Tondela	0	(0)
2018	→ Gil Vicente (loan)	18	(1)
2018–2019	→ Benfica Castelo Branco (loan)	34	(14)
2019–2020	Olhanense	24	(12)
2020–2022	Académico Viseu	63	(5)
2022–2023	Varzim	17	(0)
2023–2024	Covilhã	31	(4)
2024–2026	Lusitânia	60	(14)
- * Club domestic league appearances and goals as of 23:12, 28 May 2026 (UTC)

João Vasco Lima Santos de Miranda (born 26 December 1994), known as João Vasco, is a Portuguese professional footballer who plays as a forward.

== Club career ==
Born in the village of Darque in Viana do Castelo, João Vasco played lower league and amateur football until the age of 22. On 14 June 2017 he moved straight to the Primeira Liga by signing a three-year contract with C.D. Tondela, making his professional debut on 30 July of that year when he came on as a 74th-minute substitute in a 1–0 away loss against Vitória F.C. in the Taça da Liga.

João Vasco was loaned to Segunda Liga club Gil Vicente F.C. on 3 January 2018, until the end of the season. He scored once on 18 March, the winner as they came from behind to win 2–1 at S.L. Benfica B, as the side from Barcelos were eventually relegated.

In July 2018, in another loan, João Vasco joined Sport Benfica e Castelo Branco of the third division. During the campaign, he scored 14 times in 35 games in all competitions.

Having cut ties with Tondela, João Vasco signed a one-year deal with third-tier S.C. Olhanense on 14 August 2019. He returned to division two one year later, agreeing to a two-year contract at Académico de Viseu FC.

João Vasco competed in the third division from 2022 to 2025, with Varzim SC, S.C. Covilhã and Lusitânia FC. He helped the latter team to reach the professional leagues for the first time in their 101-year history, contributing a squad-best eight goals to the feat.

On 10 August 2025, in Lusitânia's first-ever match in division two, João Vasco scored the only goal of the away victory over C.S. Marítimo, deep in injury time.

== Personal life ==
In March 2018, João Vasco earned a master's degree from the University of Coimbra in the field of training youths in sport, having written his thesis on football and bone health.
