= Chafe =

Chafe may refer to:

- Chafé, village in Portugal
- Chafe, Nigeria, a Local Government Area in Zamfara State
- Chafe (crater), Martian crater named after Chafe, Nigeria

== People ==
- Chris Chafe (born 1952), Swiss musician and scientist
- Eric Chafe (born 1946), American musicologist
- Paul Chafe (born 1965), author
- Rick Chafe, Canadian playwright
- Robert Chafe (born 1971), Canadian playwright and actor
- Thomas Chafe (Totnes MP) (c. 1611–1662), MP for Totnes, 1660
- Thomas Chafe (Bridport MP) (c. 1642–1701), his son, MP for Bridport, 1685–1688
- Wallace Chafe (1927–2019), American linguist
- William Chafe (born 1942), American historian

== See also ==
- Friction burn
