= Barroselas =

- Civil parish
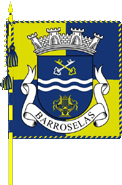
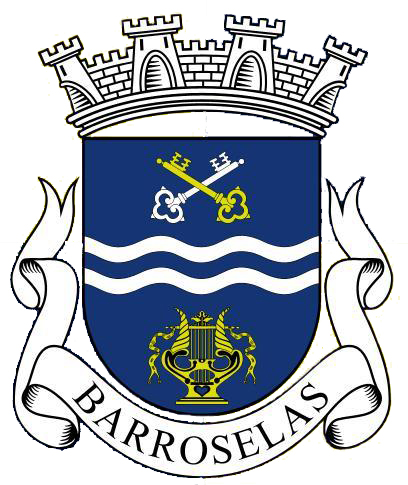
- Flag Coat of arms

- Location in Portugal
- Coordinates: 41°39′N 8°42′W
- Country: Portugal
- Region: Norte
- Intermunic. comm.: Alto Minho
- District: Viana do Castelo
- Municipality: Viana do Castelo
- Disbanded: 2013

Area
  - Total: 7.47 km^{2} (2.88 sq mi)

Population (2001)
  - Total: 3,799
  - Density: 509/km^{2} (1,320/sq mi)
- Time zone: UTC+00:00 (WET)
  - Summer (DST): UTC+01:00 (WEST)
- Website: http://barroselas-carvoeiro.com/

Barroselas is a former civil parish in the municipality of Viana do Castelo, Portugal. In 2013, the parish merged into the new parish Barroselas e Carvoeiro. On the 2001 census, Barroselas had a total population of 3,799. The total area is 7.47 km^{2} which gives a population density of 508,6 inhabitants/km^{2}.

== SWR Fest ==
The area hosts the annual heavy metal festival SWR Barroselas Metalfest (a.k.a. Steel Warriors Rebellion or simply SWR Fest) which began in 1998.

== Notable people ==
- João Queirós, footballer
