= Chico Silva =

Chico Silva may refer to:

- Chico Silva (footballer, born 1967), Portuguese football player
- Chico Silva (footballer, born 1978), Portuguese football player
