= Cathedral of St. Mary the Great, Viana do Castelo =

Coordinates: 41.6934°N 8.8271°W

Cathedral of St. Mary the Great
- Sé Catedral de Santa Maria Maior
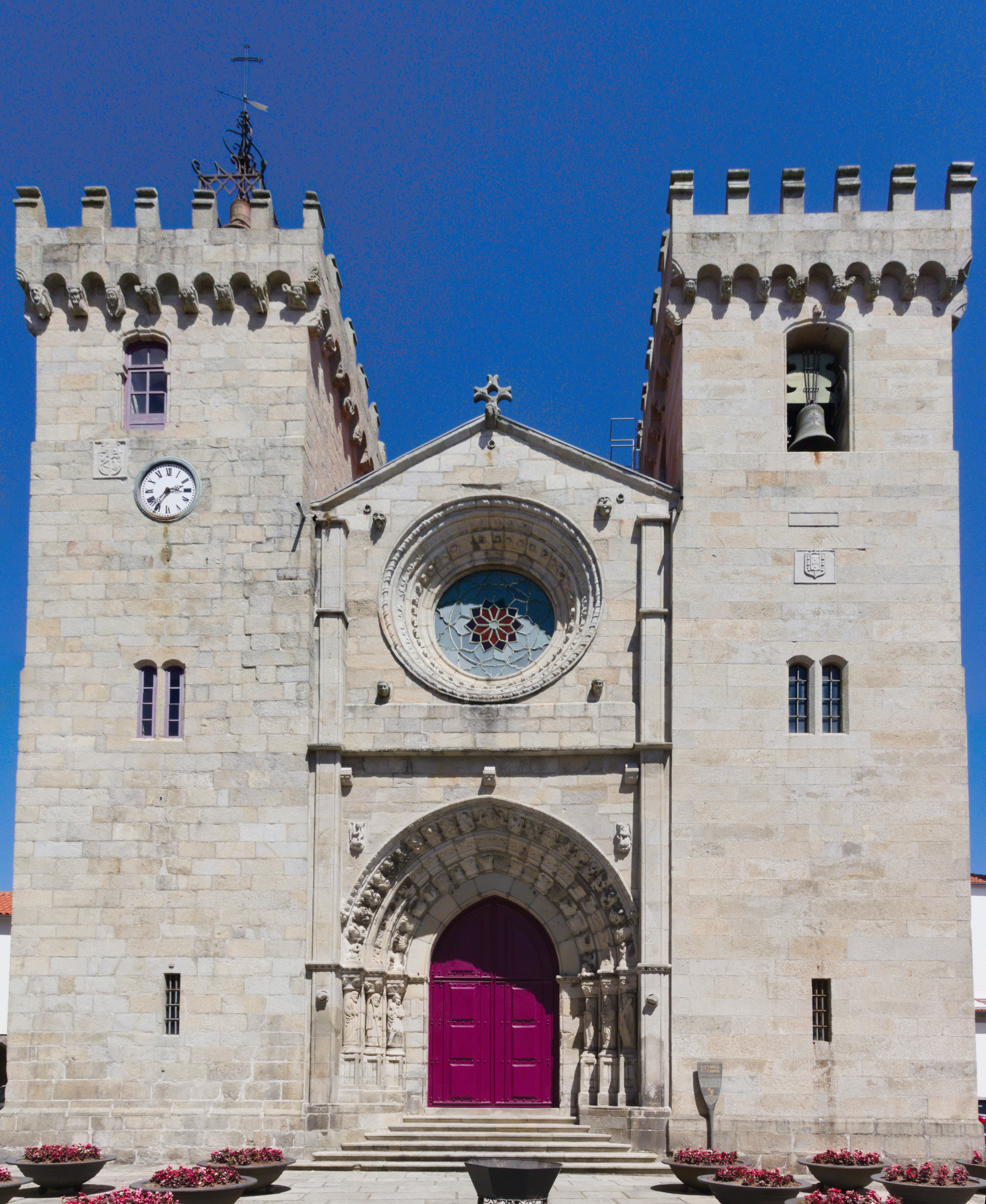
- Main façade
- Cathedral of St. Mary the Great
- Location: Viana do Castelo
- Country: Portugal
- Denomination: Roman Catholic Church

Architecture
- Functional status: Religious
- Architectural type: Romanesque architecture, Gothic architecture and Revivalism (architecture)
- Groundbreaking: 1400
- Completed: 1433

Administration
- Diocese: Diocese of Viana do Castelo

The Cathedral of St. Mary the Great (Portuguese: Sé Catedral de Santa Maria Maior) also called Viana do Castelo Cathedral is a Catholic church and fortress built in the fifteenth century, which preserves a Romanesque appearance and is located in the city of Viana do Castelo in Portugal.

Its facade is flanked by two large towers topped by battlements and highlights its beautiful Gothic portal with archivolts with sculpted scenes from the Passion of Christ and sculptures of the Apostles. It is a Romanesque church with a Latin cross and inside is separated by three arches supported on pillars ships. It is classified as Imóvel of Public Interesse.

Inside, are the chapels of St. Bernard (by Fernão Brandão) and the chapel of the Blessed Sacrament, attributed to stonemason, João Lopes the "old".

== See also ==
- Roman Catholicism in Portugal
