= Barroselas e Carvoeiro =

- Civil parish
- Location in Portugal
- Coordinates: 41.65°N 8.68°W
- Country: Portugal
- Region: Norte
- Intermunic. comm.: Alto Minho
- District: Viana do Castelo
- Municipality: Viana do Castelo

Area
  - Total: 18.68 km^{2} (7.21 sq mi)

Population (2011)
  - Total: 5,031
  - Density: 269.3/km^{2} (697.5/sq mi)
- Time zone: UTC+00:00 (WET)
  - Summer (DST): UTC+01:00 (WEST)

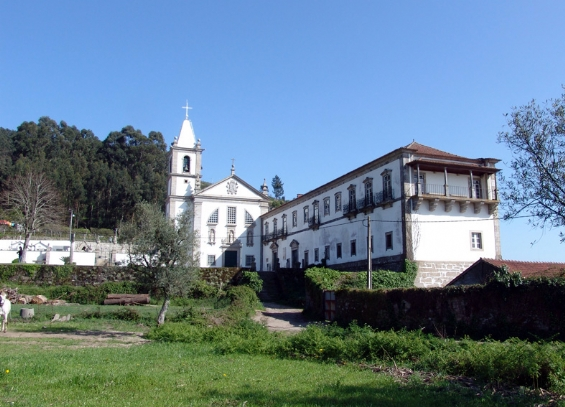
Santa Maria de Carvoeiro Monastery.

Barroselas e Carvoeiro is a civil parish in the municipality of Viana do Castelo, Portugal. It was formed in 2013 by the merger of the former parishes Barroselas and Carvoeiro. The population in 2011 was 5,031, in an area of 18.68 km².
