= Ponte Eiffel =

Bridge Eiffel Ponte Eiffel
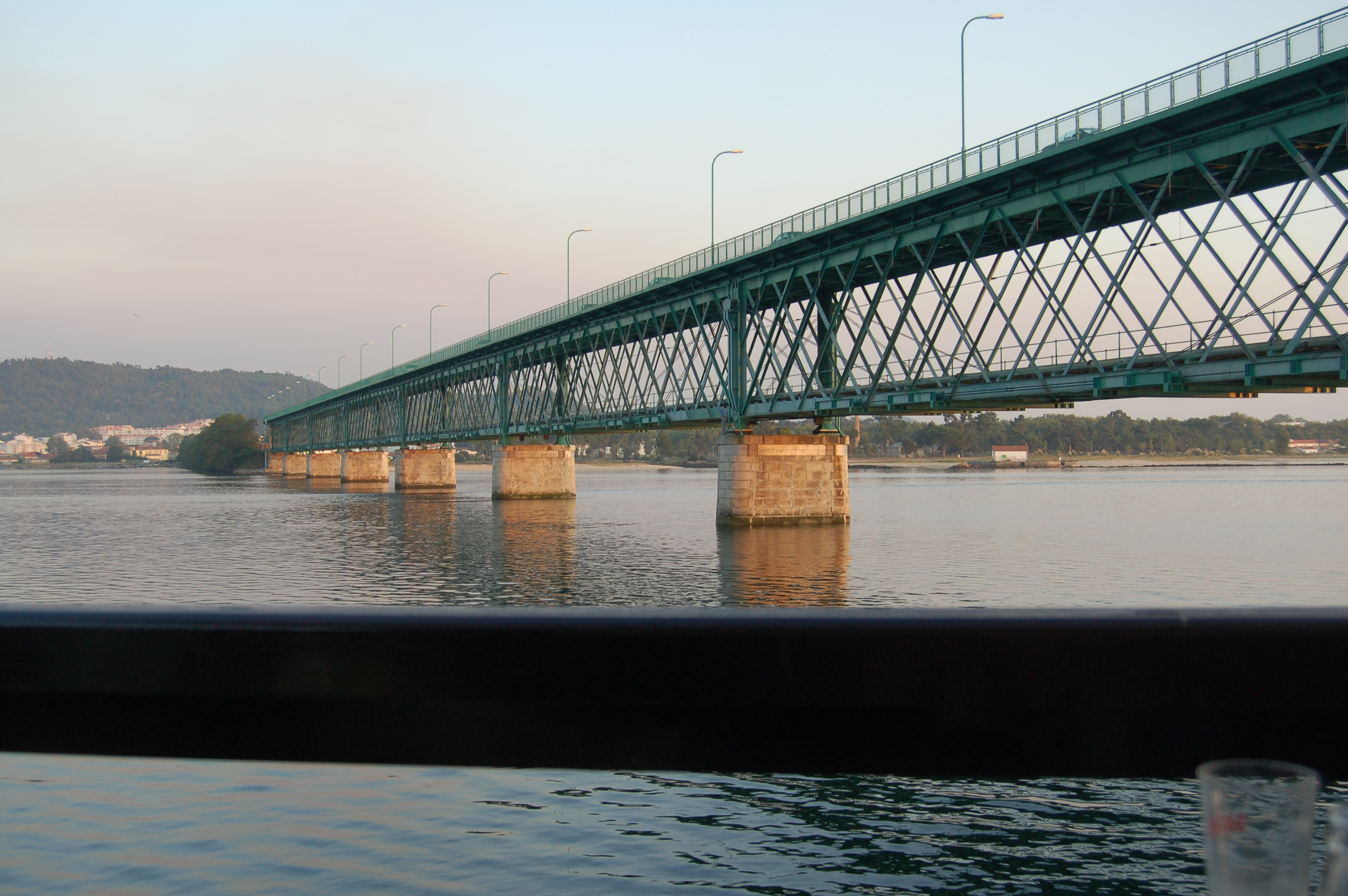
- Coordinates: 41°41′34″N 8°49′05″W
- Crosses: Lima River
- Locale: Viana do Castelo District, Portugal
- Maintained by: Infraestruturas de Portugal

Characteristics
- Total length: 645 m

History
- Designer: Gustave Eiffel
- Construction start: March 1878
- Construction end: May 1878
- Opened: 1st of July 1878

Location
- Interactive map of Bridge Eiffel

References
- http://www.monumentos.gov.pt/Site/APP_PagesUser/SIPA.aspx?id=442,,SIPA: IPA.00000442

Ponte Eiffel is a multi-level road–rail bridge crossing the Lima River in Viana do Castelo, Portugal. It was designed by Gustave Eiffel.

The structure is a candidate to the classification as a National Monument.

== See also ==
- List of bridges in Portugal
