= Mazarefes =

- Civil parish
- Location in Portugal
- Coordinates: 41.678°N 8.761°W
- Country: Portugal
- Region: Norte
- Intermunic. comm.: Alto Minho
- District: Viana do Castelo
- Municipality: Viana do Castelo

Area
  - Total: 3.48 km^{2} (1.34 sq mi)

Population (2011)
  - Total: 1,343
  - Density: 390/km^{2} (1,000/sq mi)
- Time zone: UTC+00:00 (WET)
  - Summer (DST): UTC+01:00 (WEST)

Mazarefes was a civil parish in the municipality of Viana do Castelo, Portugal, with a population of 1 343 inhabitants (2011). Since 2013, it was merged with the parish of Vila Fria, forming Mazarefes e Vila Fria.
