= Chico Silva (footballer, born 1967) =

Portuguese footballer

Personal information
- Full name: Francisco Salvador Pereira da Silva
- Date of birth: 16 March 1967 (age 59)
- Place of birth: Viana do Castelo, Portugal
- Height: 1.80 m (5 ft 11 in)
- Position: Defender

Senior career*
Years	Team	Apps	(Gls)
1986–1988	Vianense		
1988–1996	Braga	143	(4)
1996–1997	Beira-Mar	27	(2)
1997–1998	Gil Vicente	29	(3)
1998–2000	Sporting de Espinho	53	(4)
2000–2002	Vizela		
2002–2003	Vianense		
- * Club domestic league appearances and goals

Francisco Salvador Pereira da Silva (born 16 March 1967), known as Chico Silva, is a Portuguese former footballer who played as a defender. He played eight seasons and 143 games in the Primeira Liga with Braga.

== Career ==
Silva made his professional debut in the Primeira Liga for Braga on 23 October 1988 as a starter in a 0–0 draw against Marítimo.
