= Darque =

- Civil parish
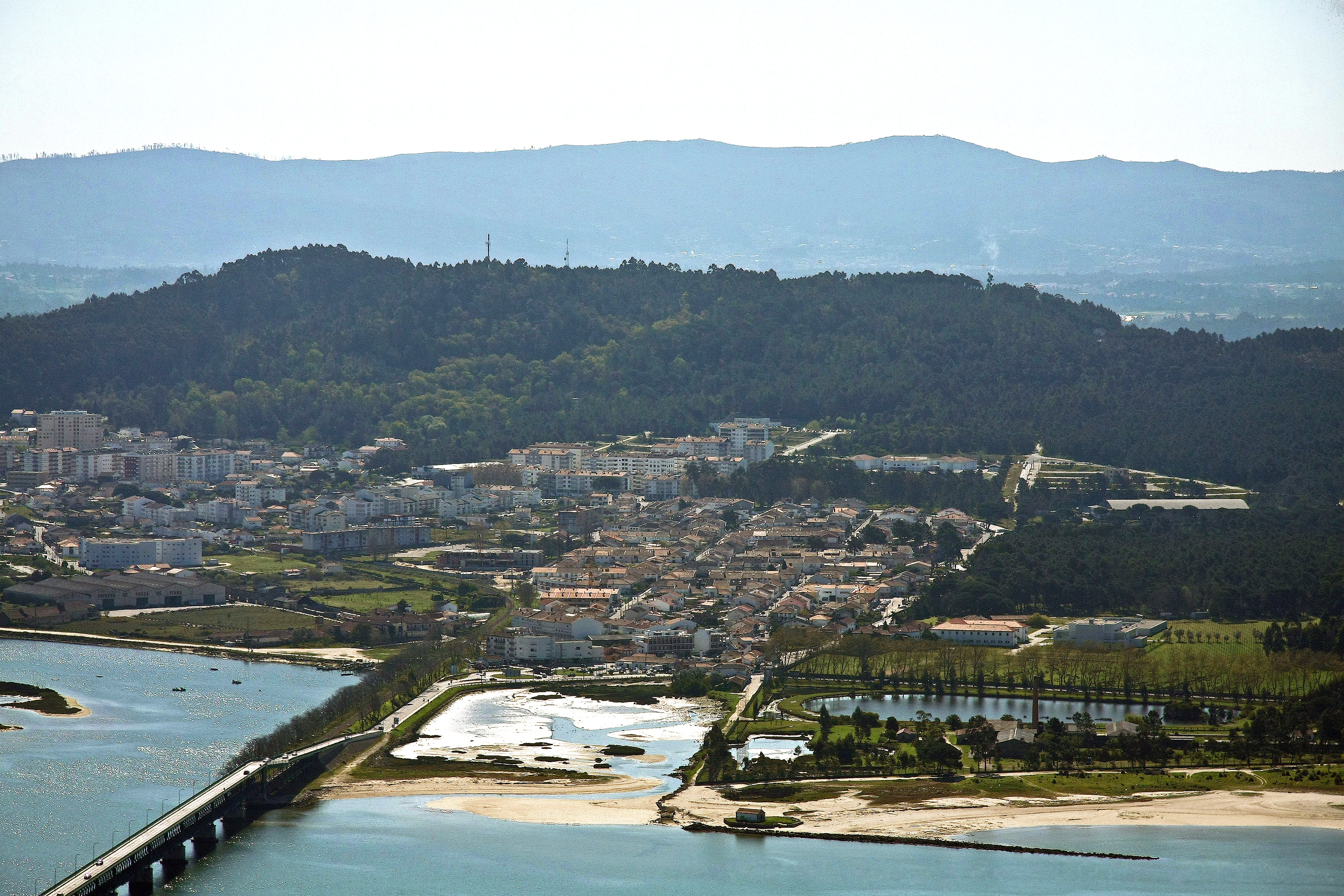
- Darque (2012)

- Location in Portugal
- Coordinates: 41.685°N 8.789°W
- Country: Portugal
- Region: Norte
- Intermunic. comm.: Alto Minho
- District: Viana do Castelo
- Municipality: Viana do Castelo

Area
  - Total: 9.01 km^{2} (3.48 sq mi)

Population (2011)
  - Total: 7,817
  - Density: 868/km^{2} (2,250/sq mi)
- Time zone: UTC+00:00 (WET)
  - Summer (DST): UTC+01:00 (WEST)

Darque (Portuguese pronunciation: [ˈdaɾk(ɨ)]) is a civil parish in the municipality of Viana do Castelo, Portugal. The population in 2011 was 7,817, in an area of 9.01 km^{2}.
