= Viana do Castelo =

- Municipality
- City of Viana do Castelo
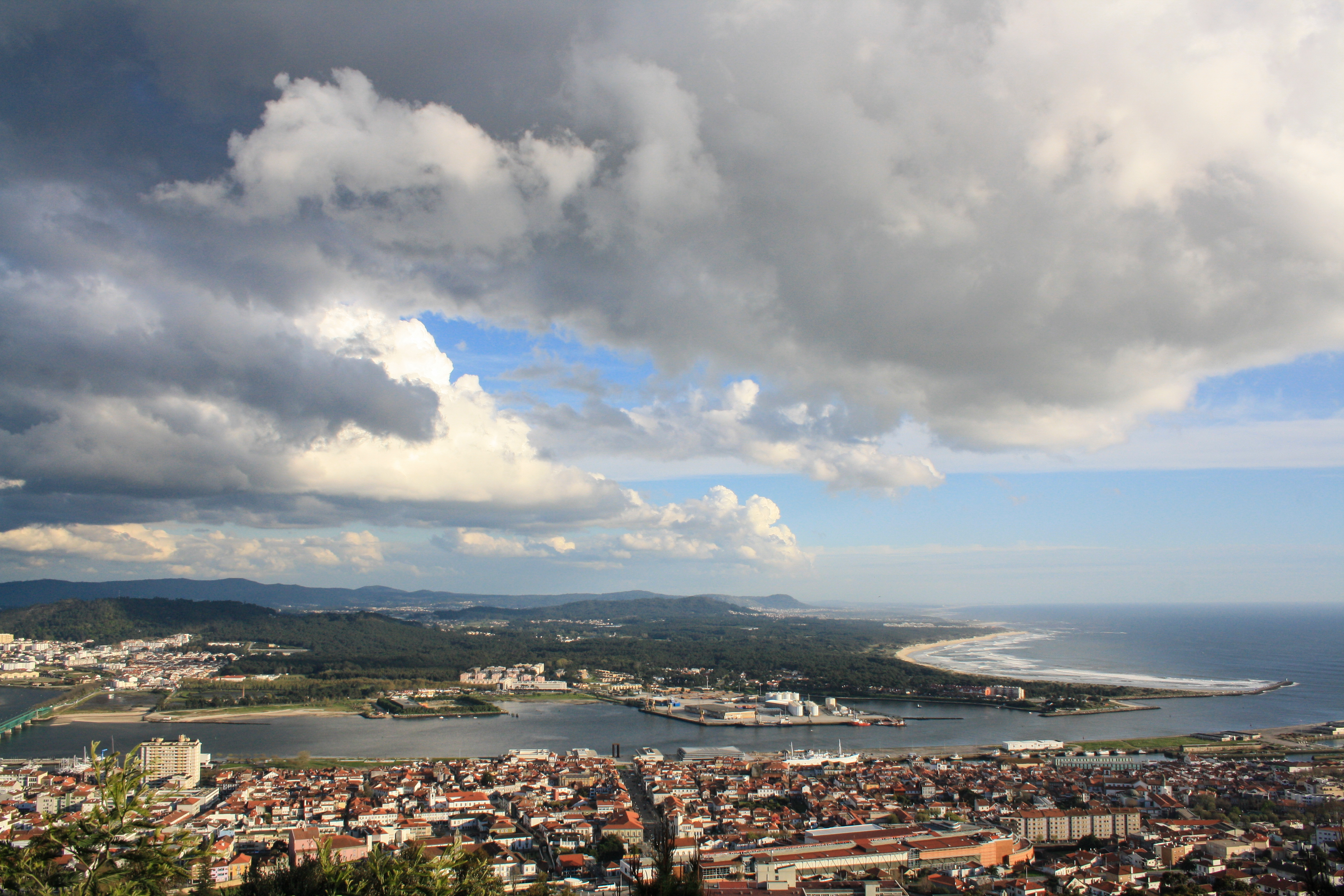
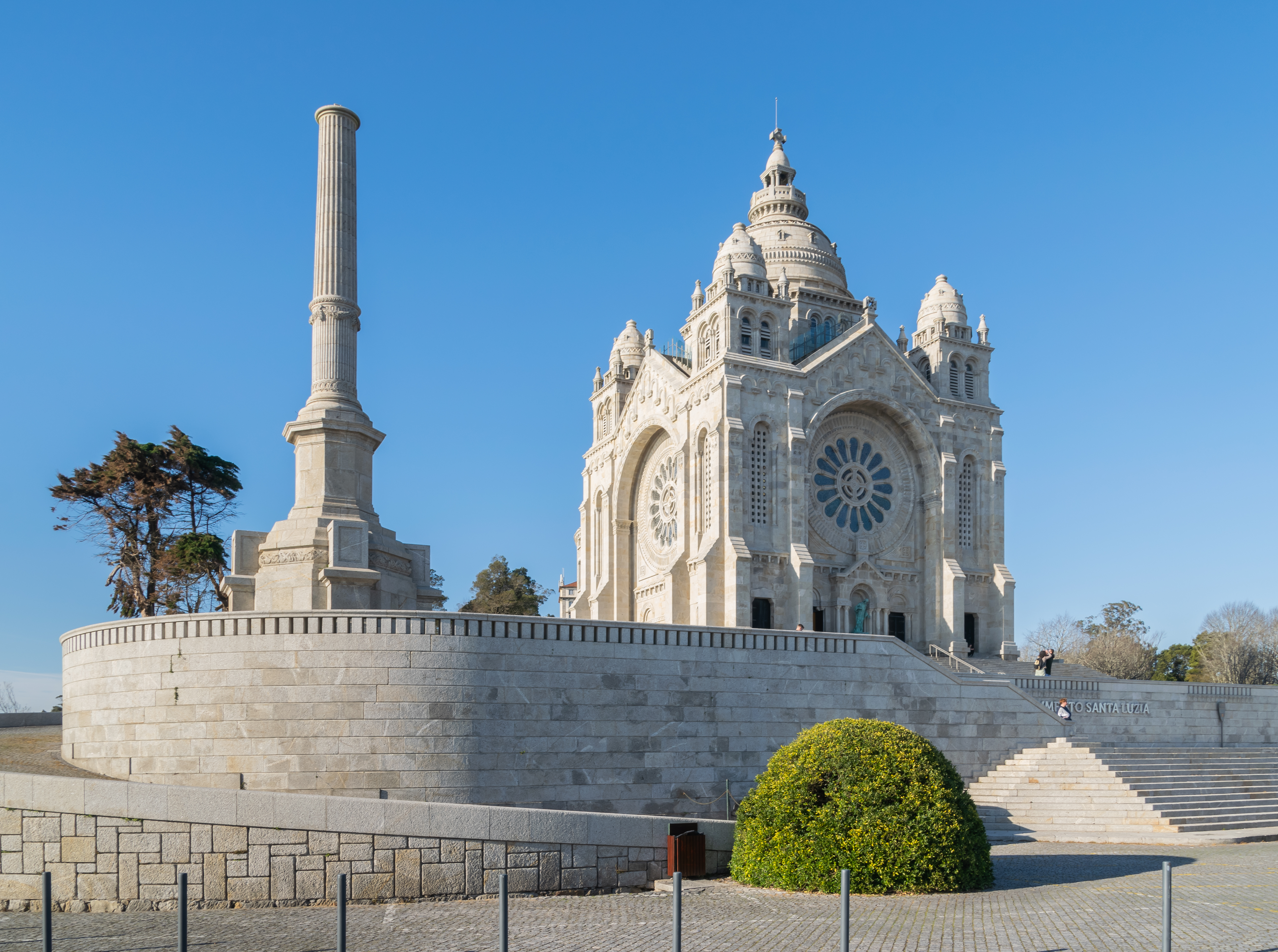
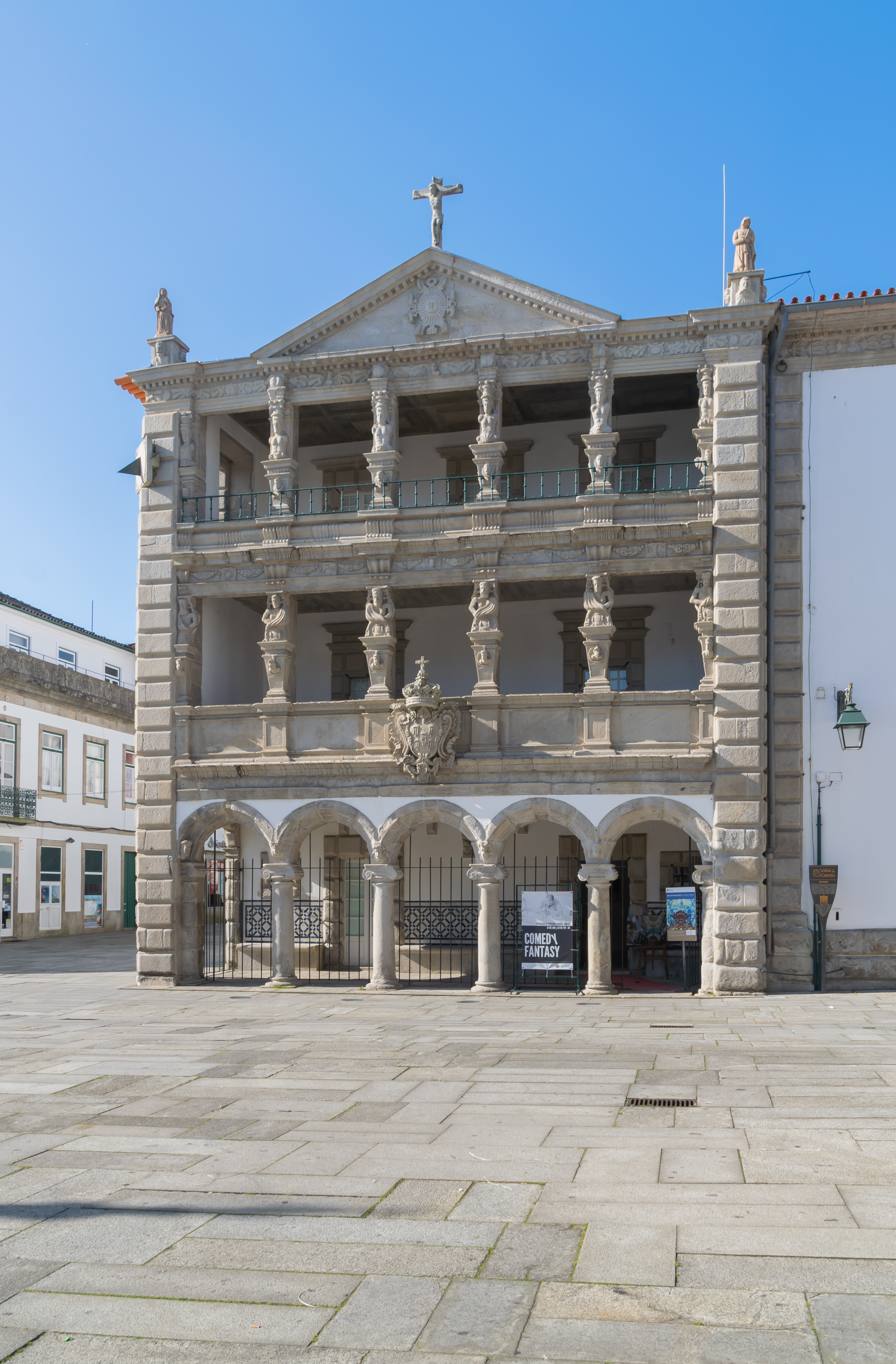
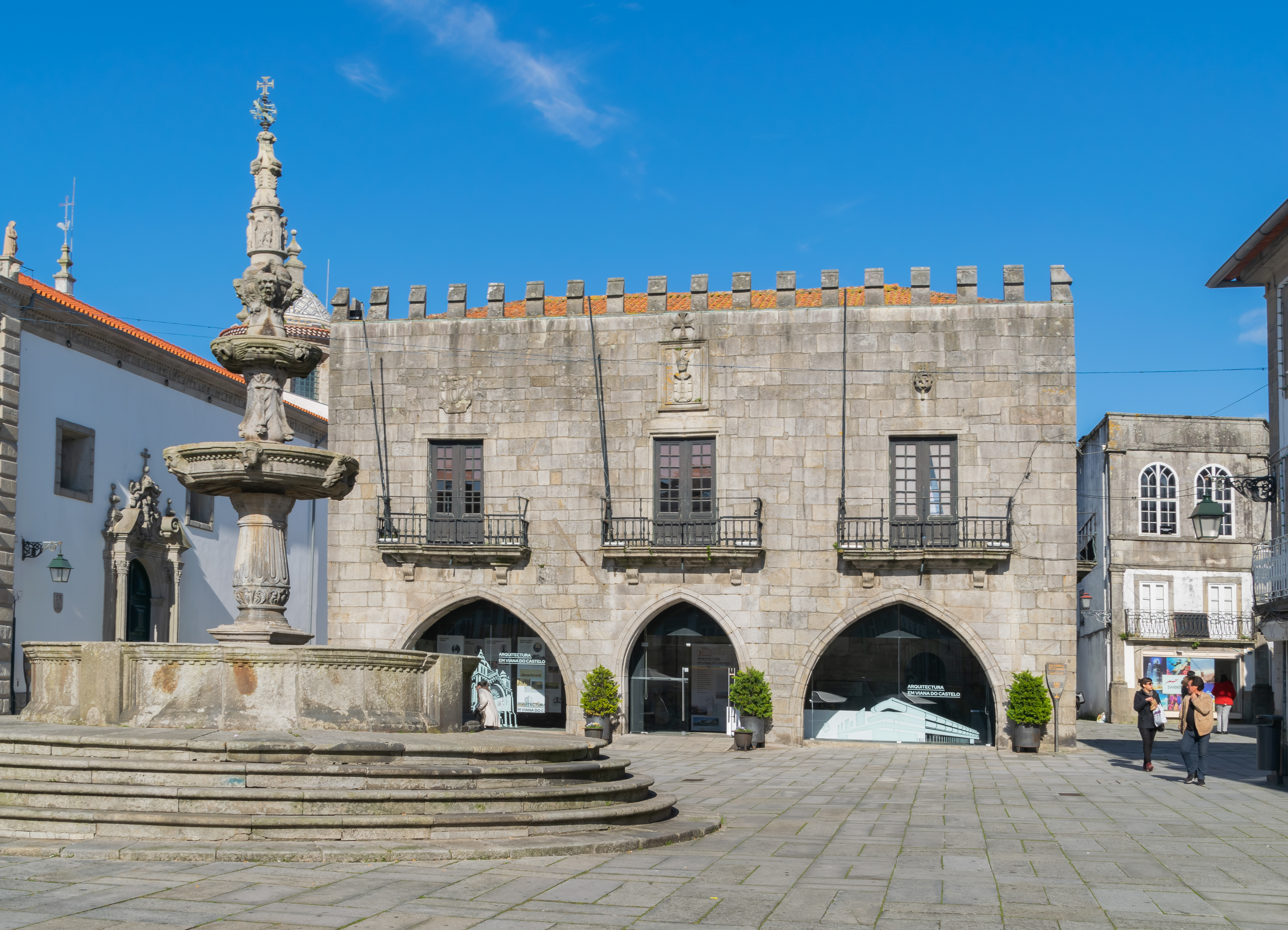
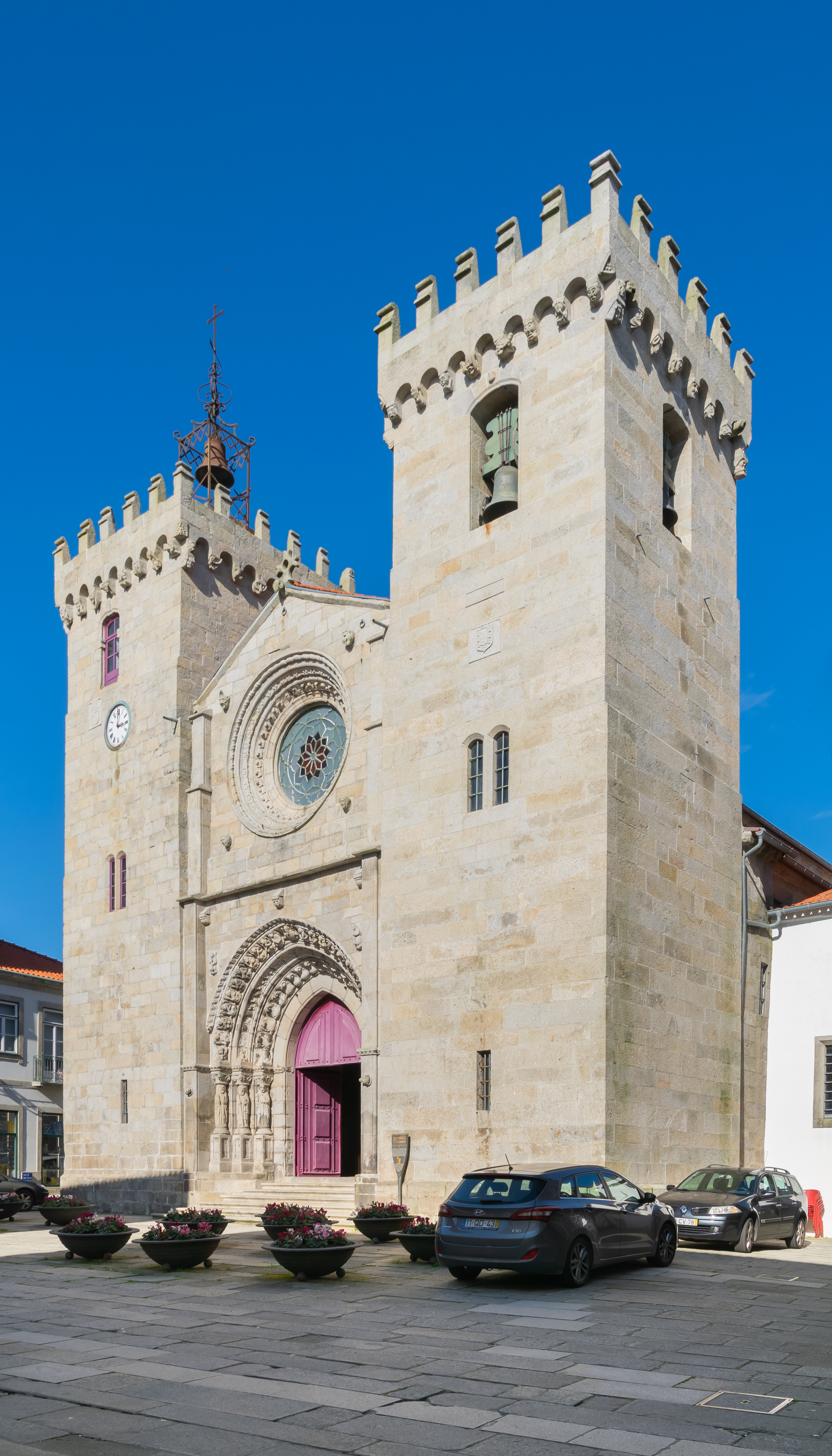
- Panorama of Viana do Castelo Sanctuary of the Sacred Heart Holy House of Mercy Republic Square Cathedral

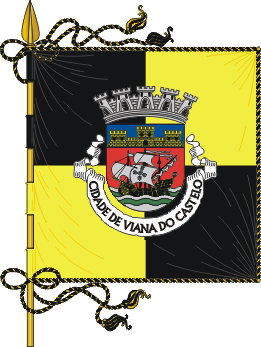
- Flag Coat of arms
- Interactive map of Viana do Castelo
- Location within Portugal Location within Europe
- Coordinates: 41°42′0″N 8°49′59.9988″W
- Country: Portugal
- Region: Northern Portugal
- Subregion: Alto Minho
- District: Viana do Castelo
- Historical province: Entre Douro e Minho
- Foral: 18 July 1258; 768 years ago
- Seat: Viana do Castelo Municipal Chamber
- Civil parishes: 30

Government
  - Type: Local administrative unit
  - Body: Câmara municipal
  - Mayor: Luís Nobre (Socialist Party)
  - Assembly chair: Ana Paula Vale

Area
  - Total: 319.02 km^{2} (123.17 sq mi)
- Highest elevation: 825 m (2,707 ft)
- Lowest elevation: 0 m (0 ft)

Population (2021)
  - Total: 85,778
  - Rank: 31st
  - Density: 268.88/km^{2} (696.40/sq mi)
- Demonym: Vianense
- Time zone: UTC (WET)
  - Summer (DST): UTC+1 (WEST)
- Postal code: 4900-XXX Viana do Castelo
- Area code: (+351) 258
- Patron Saint: Our Lady of Sorrows
- Municipal Holiday: 20 August (Festivity of Our Lady of Sorrows)
- Website: CM Viana do Castelo

Viana do Castelo, (Note: European Portuguese pronunciation: [viˈɐnɐ ðu kɐʃˈtɛlu]) officially the City of Viana do Castelo, is a city, municipality and seat of the district of Viana do Castelo in Northern Portugal. The population in 2021 was 85,778, in an area of 319.02 square kilometres (123.17 mi^{2}). The urbanized area of the municipality, comprising the city, has a population of approximately 36,148 inhabitants, although the extended densely populated region reaches surrounding municipalities like Caminha and Ponte de Lima with a population above 150,000 inhabitants. It is located at the mouth of the Lima river, on the Portuguese Way path, an alternative path of the Camino de Santiago.

== History ==
Human settlement in the region of Viana began during the Mesolithic era, from discoveries and archaeological excavations. Settlements in the Mount of Santa Luzia date back to the Iron age, extending into the Roman occupation the area.

The settlement of Viana da Foz do Lima, which it was called when King Afonso III of Portugal issued a foral (charter) on 18 July 1258, was a formalization of the 1253 Viana that the area was named.

The port in Viana do Castelo played an important role in the city's development. In the 15th century, it was on the trade routes between the Mediterranean and the North Atlantic, when textiles, fruits, wood and iron were headed south while salt and agricultural products were northbound. In 1455, a cathedral was inaugurated in Viana do Castelo. During the later part of the century, the city became an important supplier of textiles to the newly established colonies in Madeira and the Azores.

However, the port's importance grew substantially from the 16th century, during the age of discoveries, when the sugar trade from Brazil emerges in Viana. Merchants from Northern Europe establish themselves in the city, trading in sugar and selling bread from the Baltic. In parallel, the fishing industry developed, due to cod fishing off the coast of Newfoundland and Greenland, an important foodstuff for cross Atlantic voyages.

During this period of prosperity, a number of religious institutions installed themselves in the city and a via sacra (sacred way) was created, through the city's northern edge. In 1576, a Dominican convent and church is inaugurated to São Domingos (St. Dominic), designed by monk Julião Romero. In 1612, a Franciscan convent to St. Anthony was founded to the north of the city by the Order of Friars Minor. The parish of Nossa Senhora de Monserrate (Our Lady of Monserrat) was founded in 1621 next to the old barracks named Batalhão de Caçadores 9. In 1627 a decision was taken to establish a monastery of the Order of Saint Augustine to St. Theotonius. The monastery was inaugurated in 1630, but construction work continued for several years. In 1678, a chapel was built to the Holy Sepulchre, which by 1744 had originated a Marian devotion to Nossa Senhora da Agonia (Our Lady of Agony), a large worship figure in Viana, especially among fishermen.

Viana do Castelo had coastal defenses on its western side, at the mouth of the river since the reign of Alfonso III in the 13th century. During the 15th century, these would be upgraded, including Torre da Roqueta (tower of Roqueta), to protect from pirates. In the 16th century, defenses were again boosted, to protect the prosperous city, with the start of the construction of Fort Santiago da Barra.

After the maritime discoveries and trade, the commercial life of Viana reached its greatest proportions during the reign of Queen Maria II of Portugal, when the monarch established the Associação Comercial de Viana do Castelo in 1852 (the fourth oldest public company of its type). The queen, in order to reward the loyalty of its citizens, who did not surrender to the Count of Antas, elevated the town to the status of city on 20 January 1848, renaming the settlement with its current name.

In 1878, the railway line Linha do Minho reached Viana do Castelo connecting it to Porto to the south. The railway crossed the Lima river on a new railway bridge, Ponte Eiffel, designed by Gustave Eiffel. In 1882, the line was completed, reaching the border with Spain to the north and Viana's railway station was completed. During the construction process, the monastery of the Order of Saint Augustine was demolished to make way for the project and much of its stonework was repurposed for viaducts and the station building.

In 1884, the veneration of Santa Luzia (St. Lucy) strengthened after a cavalry commander Luis de Andrade e Sousa founded the Confraternity of Santa Luzia. It was founded after his poor eyesight improved following two years visiting a chapel atop the mountain of Santa Luzia. The confraternity improved the state of the chapel and its accessibility.

In 1904, construction started on the Sanctuary of the Sacred Heart of Jesus, commonly referred to as the church or sanctuary of Santa Luzia, on top of the mountain of Santa Luzia. Construction on its exterior ended in 1943, but works continue on its interior until 1959. The cult in Viana do Castelo dates back to 1743, but it grew in popularity during a pandemic in 1918. In 1926, the chapel of Santa Luzia would be demolished and its image transferred to the sanctuary.

During the Estado Novo dictatorship, a shipbuilding industry was established in the city's port. On June 4, 1944, the Estaleiros Nacionais de Viana do Castelo (ENVC) were founded as part of a government program to modernize the country's fishing fleet. The shipyard was initially focused on constructing long-distance fishing vessels, such as those for cod fishing, but diversified its portfolio throughout the 20th century. The shipyard ran into financial difficulties in the 2000s, leading to a bankruptcy and restructuring in 2013.

== Geography ==
Population of; Viana do Castelo; (1801–2021)
Year	Pop.	±%
1801	17,889	—
1849	36,084	+101.7%
1864	42,526	+17.9%
1878	43,033	+1.2%
1890	46,269	+7.5%
1900	47,311	+2.3%
1911	51,466	+8.8%
1920	52,858	+2.7%
1930	53,380	+1.0%
1960	75,320	+41.1%
1970	70,455	−6.5%
1981	81,009	+15.0%
1991	83,095	+2.6%
2001	88,631	+6.7%
2011	88,725	+0.1%
2021	85,778	−3.3%
Source: INE

Administratively, the municipality is divided into 30 civil parishes (freguesias):

- Afife
- Alvarães
- Amonde
- Anha
- Areosa
- Barroselas e Carvoeiro
- Cardielos e Serreleis
- Carreço
- Castelo do Neiva
- Chafé
- Darque
- Freixieiro de Soutelo
- Geraz do Lima (Santa Maria, Santa Leocádia e Moreira) e Deão
- Lanheses
- Mazarefes e Vila Fria
- Montaria
- Mujães
- Nogueira, Meixedo e Vilar de Murteda
- Outeiro
- Perre
- Santa Marta de Portuzelo
- São Romão de Neiva
- Subportela, Deocriste e Portela Susã
- Torre e Vila Mou
- Viana do Castelo (Santa Maria Maior e Monserrate) e Meadela
- Vila de Punhe
- Vila Franca
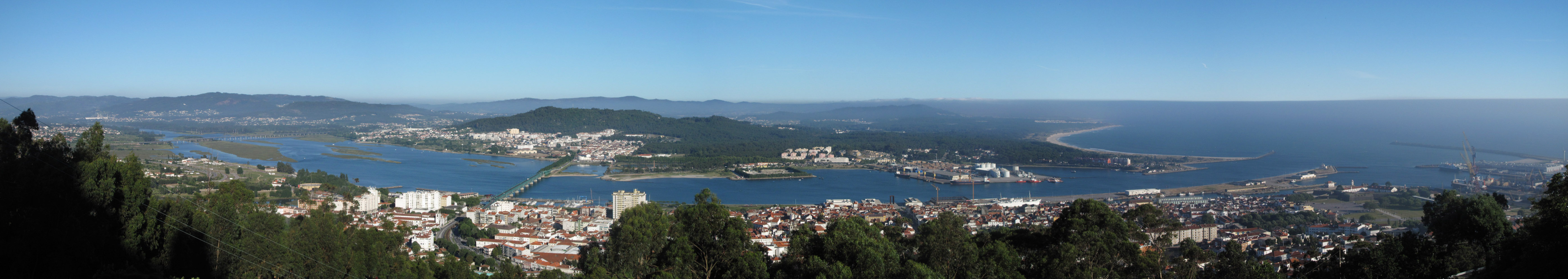
Panoramic view of Viana do Castelo, Portugal

=== Climate ===
Viana do Castelo has a warm-summer Mediterranean climate (Köppen: Csb; Thornthwaite: ArB'2a') with substantial oceanic influences characterized by warm, relatively dry summers and mild, rainy winters. It is also one of the rainiest cities in Continental Portugal.

Temperatures above 30 °C are relatively rare during summertime, happening on about 20 days per year on average; while in the cold months there are on average 29 days with frost.

Climate data for Viana do Castelo (Meadela)
Month	Jan	Feb	Mar	Apr	May	Jun	Jul	Aug	Sep	Oct	Nov	Dec	Year
Record high °C (°F)	24.0 (75.2)	25.0 (77.0)	30.5 (86.9)	31.6 (88.9)	35.6 (96.1)	38.6 (101.5)	38.0 (100.4)	39.5 (103.1)	36.4 (97.5)	32.6 (90.7)	26.2 (79.2)	24.6 (76.3)	39.5 (103.1)
Mean daily maximum °C (°F)	14.6 (58.3)	15.5 (59.9)	17.9 (64.2)	18.5 (65.3)	20.7 (69.3)	24.5 (76.1)	26.3 (79.3)	26.4 (79.5)	24.8 (76.6)	20.9 (69.6)	17.4 (63.3)	15.2 (59.4)	20.2 (68.4)
Daily mean °C (°F)	9.8 (49.6)	10.5 (50.9)	12.7 (54.9)	13.7 (56.7)	15.9 (60.6)	19.2 (66.6)	20.8 (69.4)	20.8 (69.4)	19.2 (66.6)	16.1 (61.0)	12.8 (55.0)	10.8 (51.4)	15.2 (59.3)
Mean daily minimum °C (°F)	4.9 (40.8)	5.5 (41.9)	7.4 (45.3)	8.8 (47.8)	11.1 (52.0)	13.9 (57.0)	15.3 (59.5)	15.1 (59.2)	13.7 (56.7)	11.2 (52.2)	8.1 (46.6)	6.4 (43.5)	10.1 (50.2)
Record low °C (°F)	−3.9 (25.0)	−2.8 (27.0)	−3.7 (25.3)	−0.4 (31.3)	0.8 (33.4)	5.5 (41.9)	9.0 (48.2)	8.0 (46.4)	7.0 (44.6)	2.4 (36.3)	−1.2 (29.8)	−5.1 (22.8)	−5.1 (22.8)
Average rainfall mm (inches)	189.9 (7.48)	168.0 (6.61)	105.3 (4.15)	117.7 (4.63)	105.5 (4.15)	56.1 (2.21)	28.4 (1.12)	30.6 (1.20)	95.7 (3.77)	163.9 (6.45)	180.8 (7.12)	228.3 (8.99)	1,470.2 (57.88)
Average rainy days (≥ 0.1 mm)	16.3	15.0	13.9	15.3	14.5	9.2	6.6	6.5	9.0	15.0	15.0	17.3	153.6
Mean monthly sunshine hours	127.9	130.0	182.5	206.9	234.7	270.6	300.5	285.9	211.8	167.0	136.5	114.9	2,369.2
Source: Instituto de Meteorologia (1981-2010 temperature normals, 1971-2000 precipitation and sunshine hours)

== Economy ==
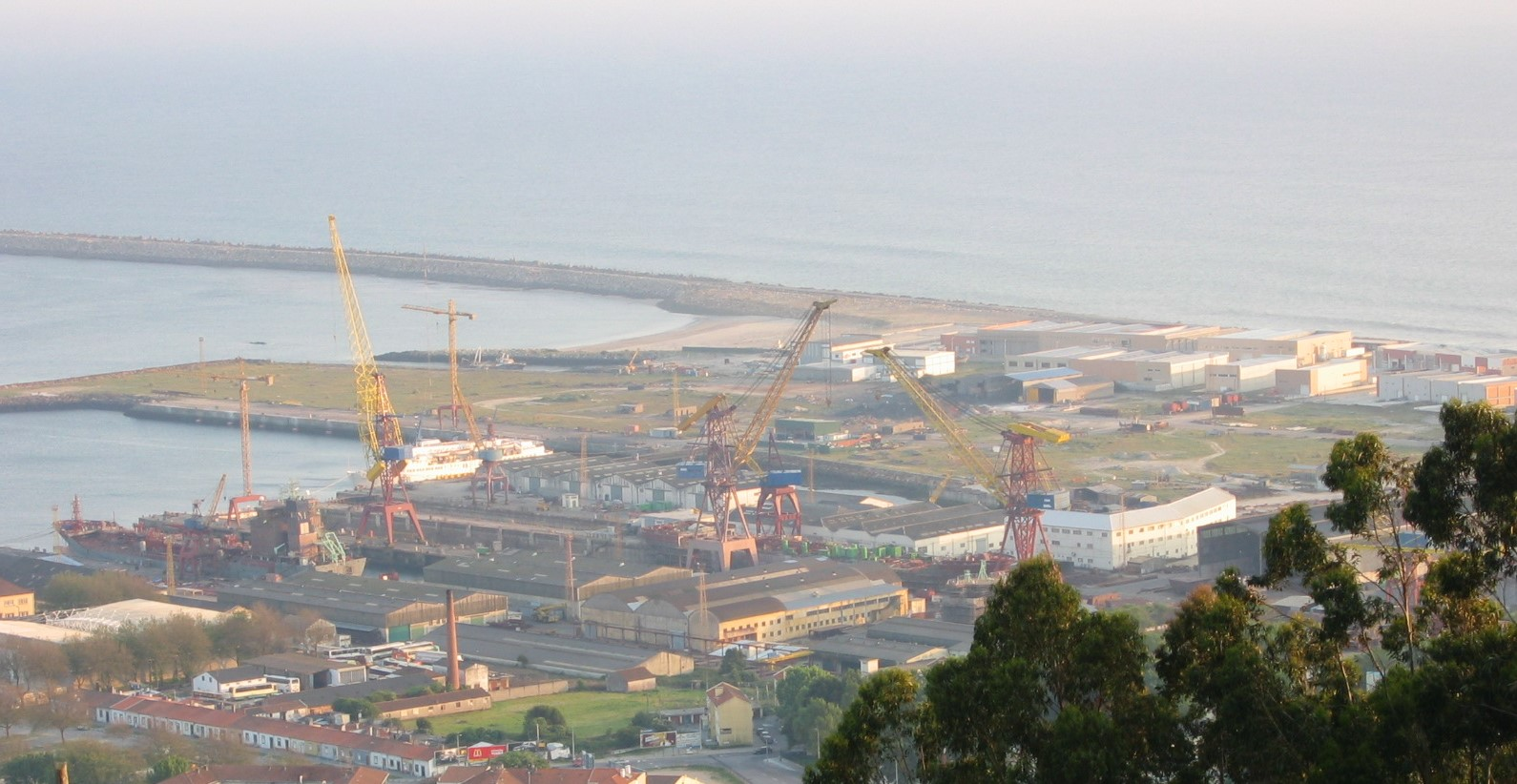
Shipyard in Viana do Castelo

Home to a modern service based economy, the city, along with its region, has a seaport with naval repairing facilities. Industry is a cornerstone of Viana do Castelo's economy, benefiting from its strategic location along Atlantic trade routes and investments in industrial parks. Key sectors include shipbuilding, forestry, metal products, machinery, and seafood processing. The municipality hosts one of Portugal's shipyards, the West Sea Shipyard (formerly Estaleiros Navais de Viana do Castelo), although the shipbuilding industry has faced challenges, including bankruptcy and restructuring in 2013.

In the forestry sector, Viana do Castelo ranks among the top five exporters in the Norte region, driven by its robust pulp and paper industry, which generated €249 million in exports in 2020. The machinery industry is also expanding, highlighted by BorgWarner's €90 million investment in 2023 to establish a factory for producing electric motors and components for hybrid and electric vehicles. Additionally, Viana do Castelo plays a prominent role in high-technology exports, contributing 10.1% of the North Region's exports in this category.

Renewable energy has also become a key driver of the local economy. The WindFloat Atlantic offshore wind farm, located off the coast of Viana do Castelo, has been operational since 2020. With three floating turbines, it has consistently supplied electricity to over 25,000 homes annually, avoiding over 33,000 tons of CO_{2} emissions. As of 2024, it supported 1,500 direct and indirect jobs throughout its development, construction, and operation phases.

== Transport ==
=== Roads ===
Viana do Castelo is served by several major roadways that connect it to other parts of northern Portugal and to Spain. The city lies along the A28 motorway, linking it to Porto in the south and Vila Nova de Cerveira to the north, from where the route N13 heads towards the Spanish border near Valença. Additionally, the A27 motorway starts in Viana and heads eastwards towards Ponte de Lima, where it links with the A3 motorway.

There are several national routes passing through the municipality, connecting to the city and its other civil parishes. N13 runs alongside the Atlantic coast, linking the city to Areosa, Carreço and Afife and to the towns of Caminha and Vila Praia de Âncora to the north and to Darque, Anha, Chafé, São Romão de Neiva and Castelo de Neiva (via the N13-3 branch) and the town of Esposende to the south. N202 and N203 have an east-west alignment, running alongside the Lima River towards Ponte de Lima. N202 goes along the northern bank, connecting Viana do Castelo with the parishes of Santa Marta de Portuzelo, Cardielos, Serreleis, Torre, Vila Mou and Lanheses. N203 runs along the southern bank, linking Darque with Mazarefes, Vila Franca, Deão and Geraz do Lima. Other national routes include N302 linking the city to Perre and Outeiro, N308 linking Darque to Vila de Punhe, Barroselas and Carvoeiro and N305, an orbital route connecting several parishes and crossing the Lima River at Geraz do Lima and Lanheses.

=== Buses ===
Viana do Castelo has an urban bus network named TuViana, operating inside the city of Viana do Castelo and in the parishes of Carreço, Areosa, Perre, Santa Marta de Portuzelo, Darque, Anha, Chafé, Mazarefes and Vila Fria. Its 14 lines span a total of 293 kilometres (182 mi) for regular services and 129 kilometres (80 mi) for school services. Other bus operators providing local or intermunicipal services include Auto Viação Cura, AVIC and A. V. Minho.

Several operators provide express services from Viana do Castelo to other cities, such as Porto, including A. V. Minho, FlixBus, Rede Expressos and Ovnitur. Additionally, the operator Getbus provides direct connections between Viana do Castelo and Porto Airport.

=== Railways ===
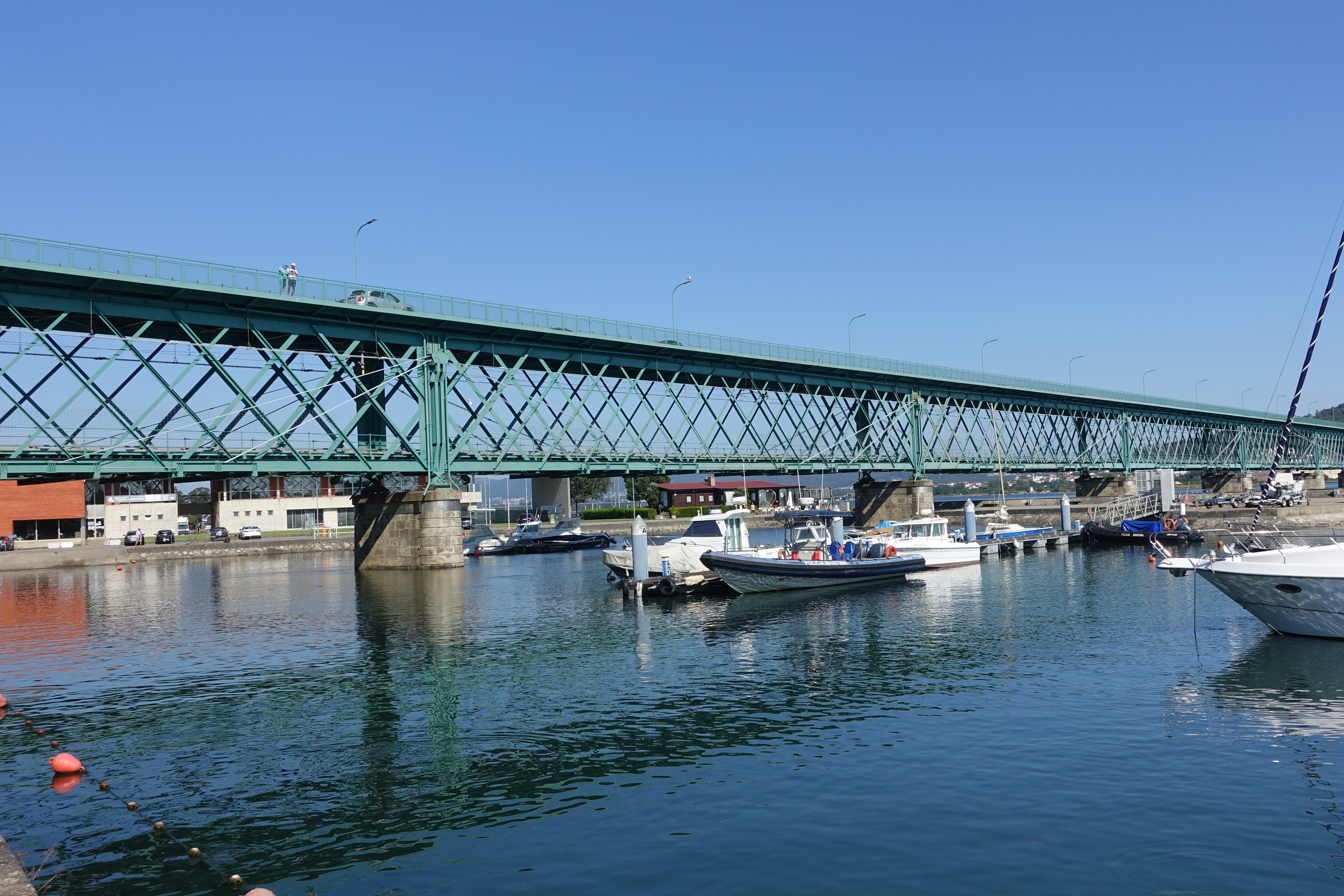
Eiffel bridge, where the Minho Line crosses the Lima River in Viana.

Viana do Castelo is served by the Minho railway line, which connects Porto to Valença, at the Spanish border. Rail services are operated by Comboios de Portugal, with trains calling at three stations within the municipality, Viana do Castelo, Darque, and Barroselas, and at six halts: Senhora das Neves, Alvarães, Areia-Darque, Areosa, Carreço, and Afife.

Four types of passenger services operate on this line: regional, interregional, intercity, and the international Celta service. Regional trains run between Porto (São Bento) and Valença, stopping at all stations and halts. Interregional services operate between Figueira da Foz and Valença, stopping at Barroselas, Areia-Darque, Viana do Castelo, and Afife. Intercity trains connect Coimbra to Valença, stopping at Barroselas and Viana do Castelo, while the Celta trains link Porto (Campanhã) with Vigo (Guixar), in Spain, stopping only at Viana do Castelo.

=== Port ===
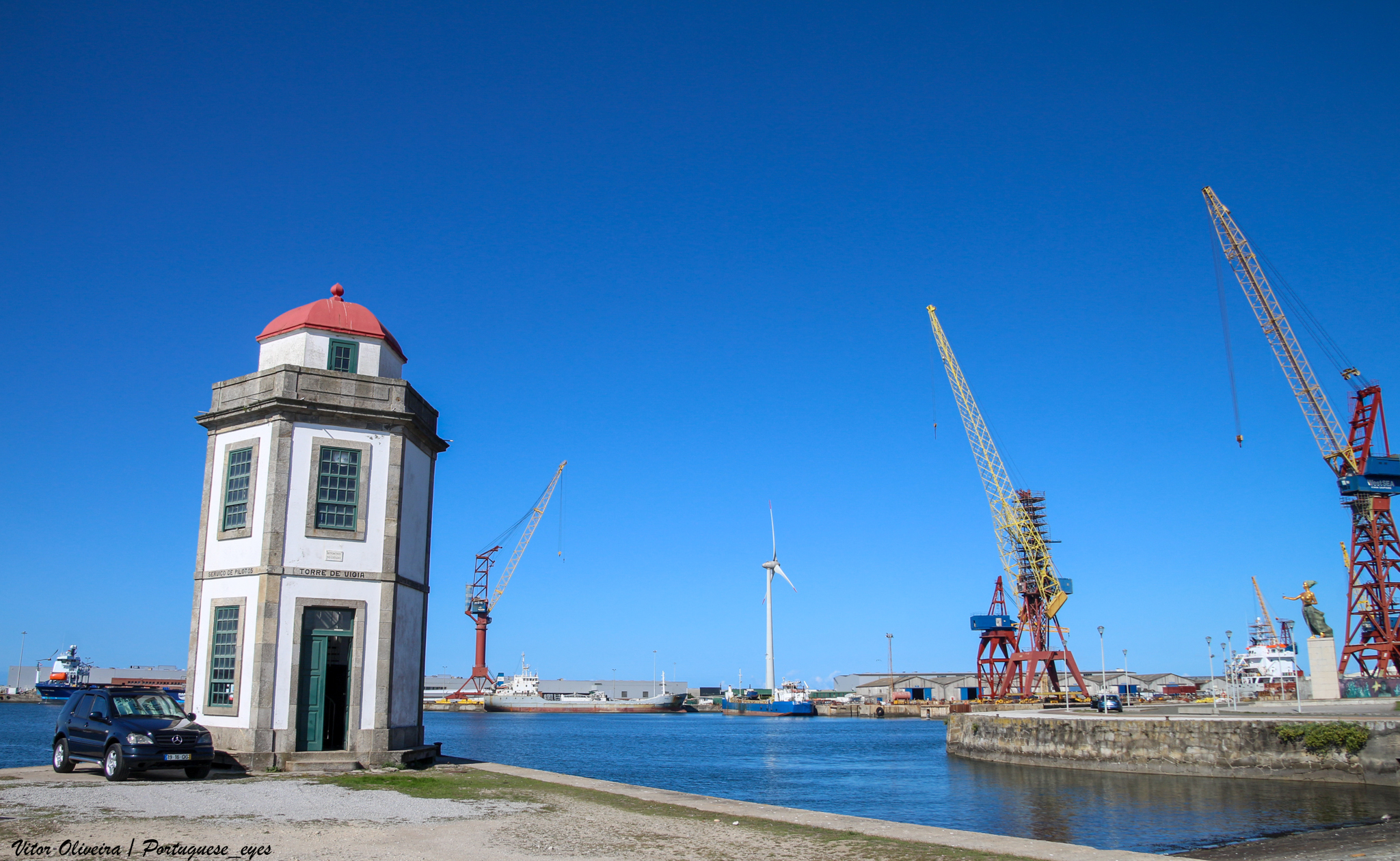
Port of Viana do Castelo

The Port of Viana do Castelo is a seaport managed by APDL located by the city of Viana do Castelo at the mouth of the Lima River. It is Portugal's seventh largest seaport in terms of cargo, handling primarily breakbulk cargo, dry bulk, including cement, and some liquid bulk cargoes, such as asphalt. In 2024, 196 ships called at the port and 332,000 tonnes of cargo were handled, equivalent to 0.4% of maritime cargo in Portugal. The port also includes a fishing harbour and a marina, and occasionally serves cruise ships, with twelve calls recorded in 2023.

=== Aviation ===
The nearest airports are Porto Airport, located approximately 60 km (37 mi) south and Vigo–Peinador Airport in Spain, located approximately 70 km (43 mi) northeast of Viana do Castelo.

== Architecture ==
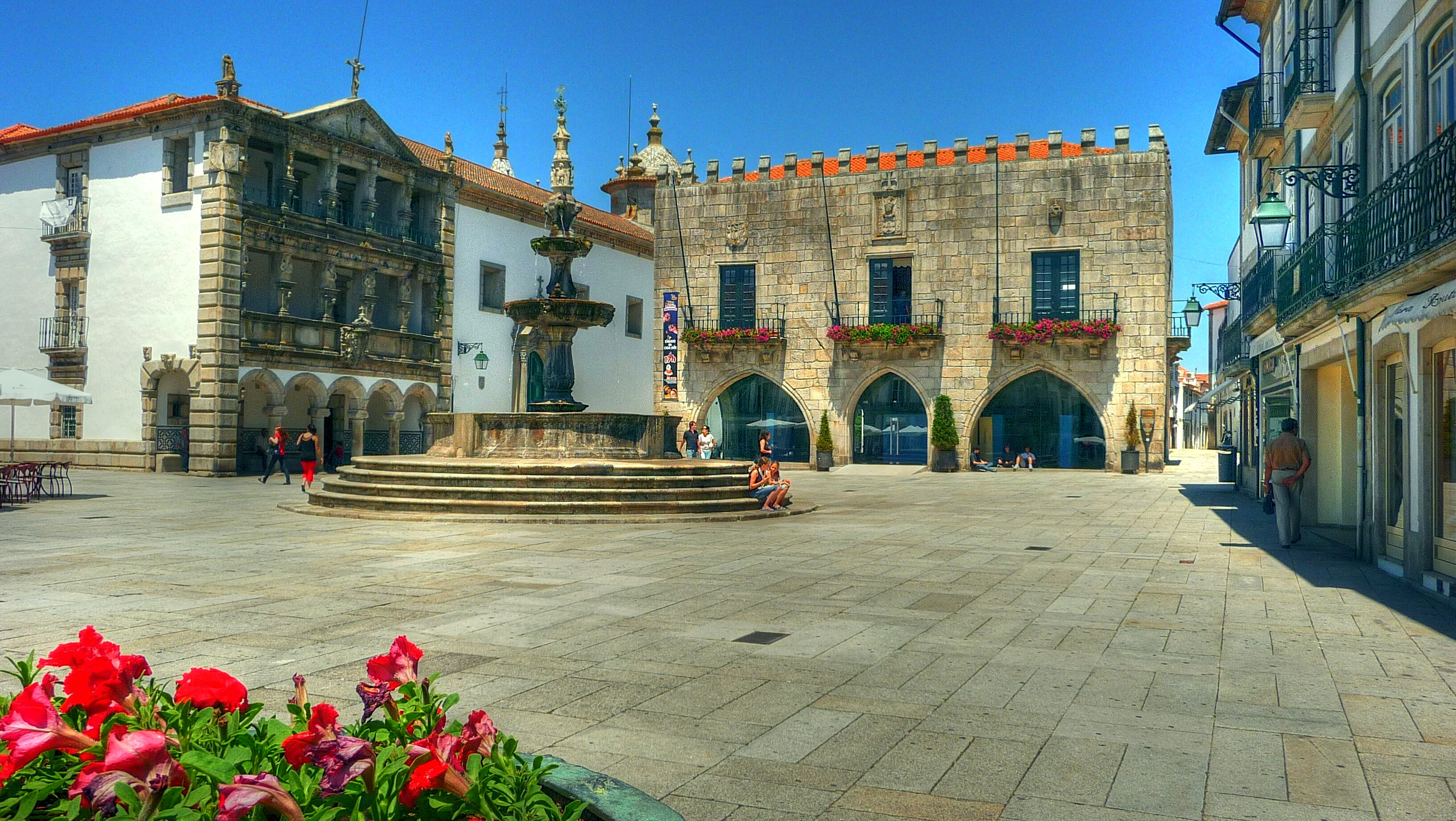
Republic Square: historical centre of Viana do Castelo

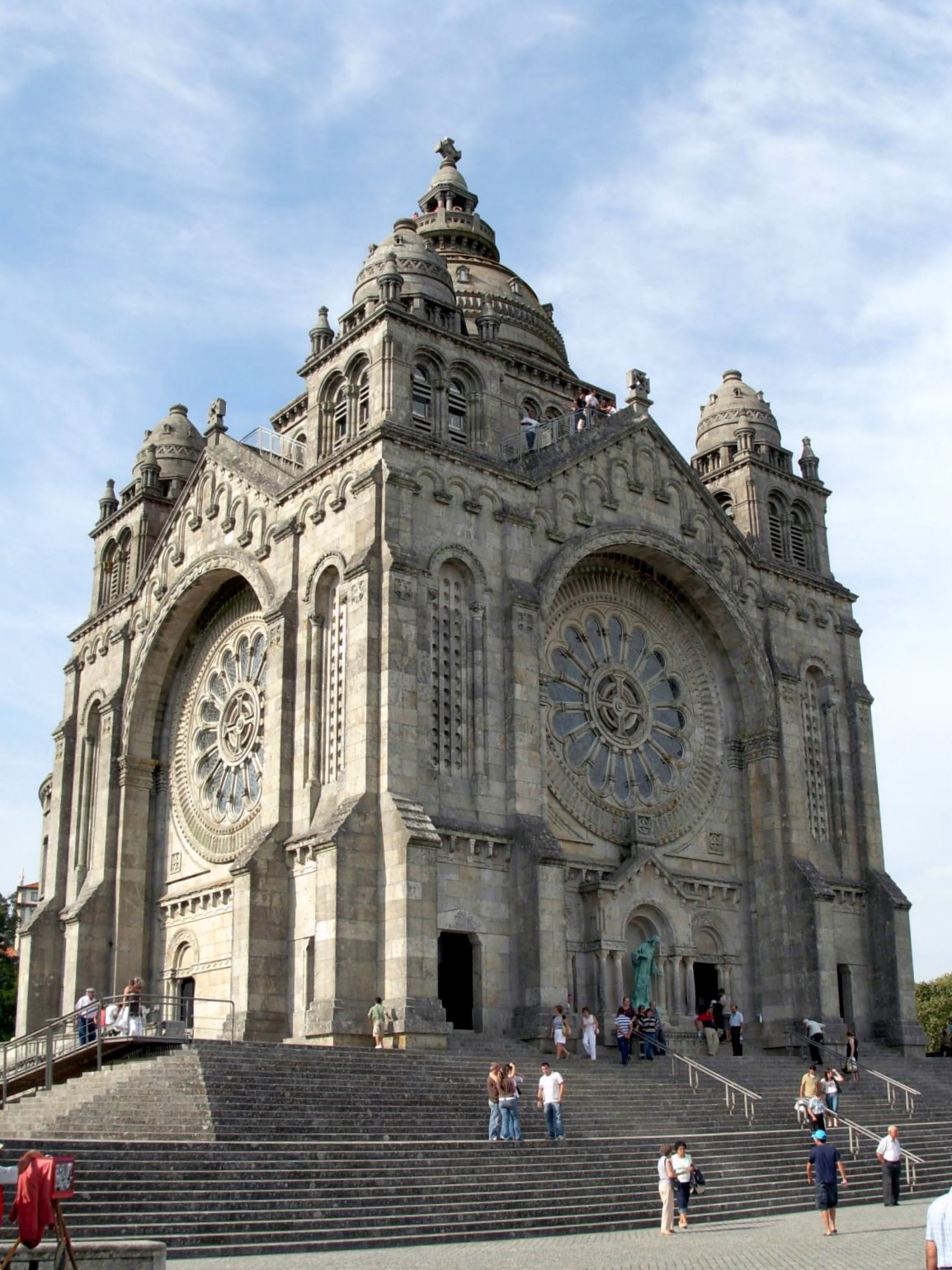
Sanctuary of the Sacred Heart of Jesus

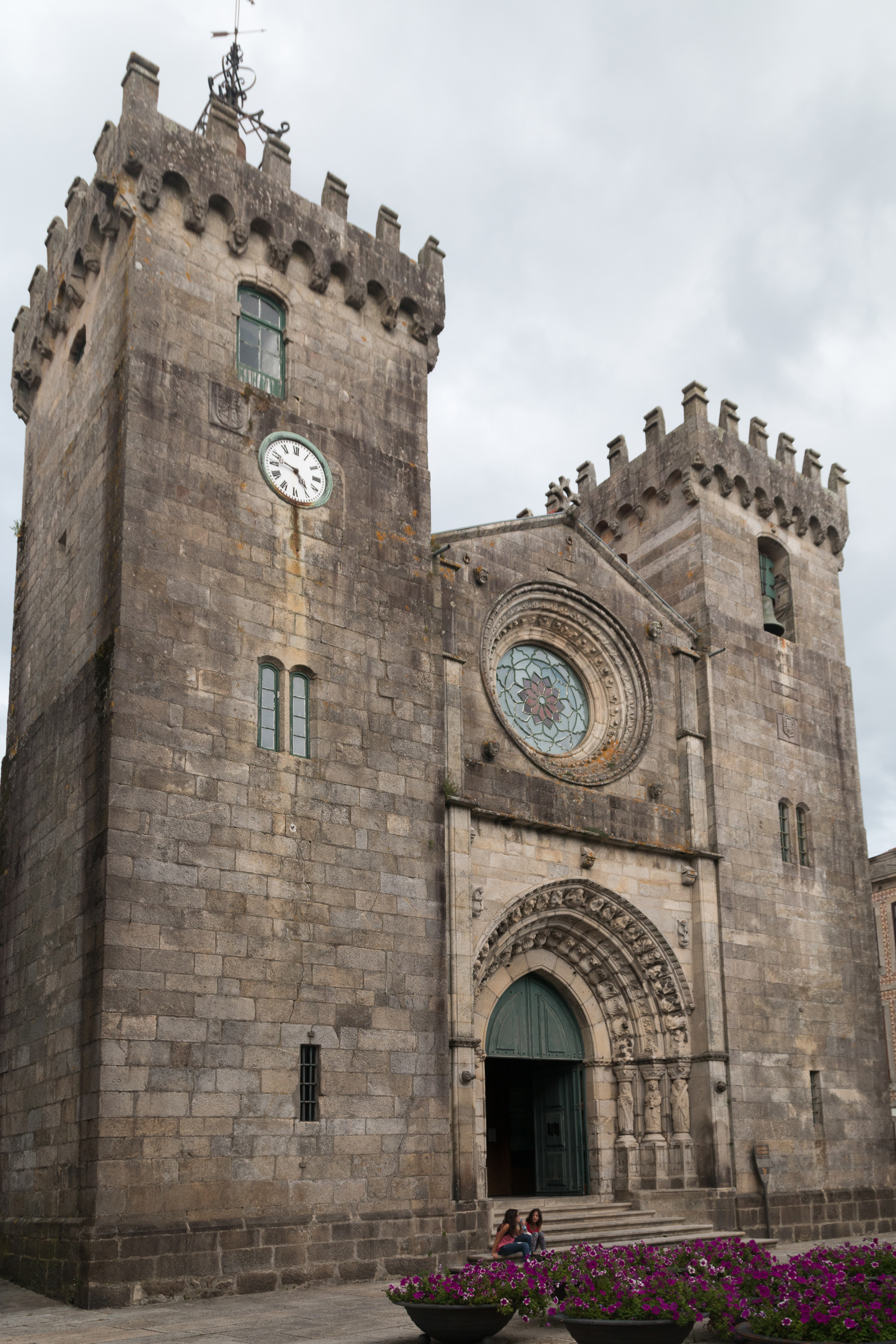
Cathedral of Viana do Castelo

=== Civic ===
Since the early 1990s the city started a wide urban renewal plan, pioneering the "Polis program", and including enlarging the pedestrian areas, building new modern architecture and creating new public spaces and parks. Architects such as Siza Vieira, Eduardo Souto de Moura and Fernando Távora have participated in the construction of a modern, well preserved and lively city center.

- Geraz do Lima carriage museum
- Renaissance fountain (1535) in the Major Square
- Palacio de Tavoras, a noble residence from the 16th and 17th centuries
- Municipal Museum, housed in an 18th-century building and home to
- Paços do Conselho ("Palace of the Council", 1502), of which only the façade remains today

=== Religious ===
- Church of São Domingos (1576)
- Chapel of the Holy Family (Portuguese: Capela da Sagrada Família e Portal da Quinta dos Espregueira)
- Chapel of Our Lady of the Agony (Portuguese: Capela de Nossa Senhora da Agonia), church in Roccoco style
- Cathedral of Viana do Castelo (Portuguese: Igreja Matriz de Viana do Castelo/Catedral de Viana do Castelo/Sé de Viana do Castelo), the 15th-century parochial church and cathedral, was constructed in the Romanesque style, comprising a façade flanked by two large towers with merlons, while the middle Gothic portal with archivolts is decorated by sculptures depicting the Passion of Christ and of the Apostles. The interior designed in the form of the Latin cross, includes a nave and two aisles (separated by arches supported by pillars), as well as two ancillary chapels dedicated to São Bernardo and the Holy Sacrament, both attributed to João Lopes "the Elder".
- Church of Mercy of Viana do Castelo (Portuguese: Igreja da Misericórdia de Viana do Castelo), designed in the Flemish-style. The building dates back to 1589.
- Sanctuary of Saint Lucy (Portuguese: Santuário de Santa Luzia), designed by Miguel Ventura Terra and dedicated to the cult of the Sacred Heart of Jesus and Saint Lucy of Syracuse.

== Culture ==
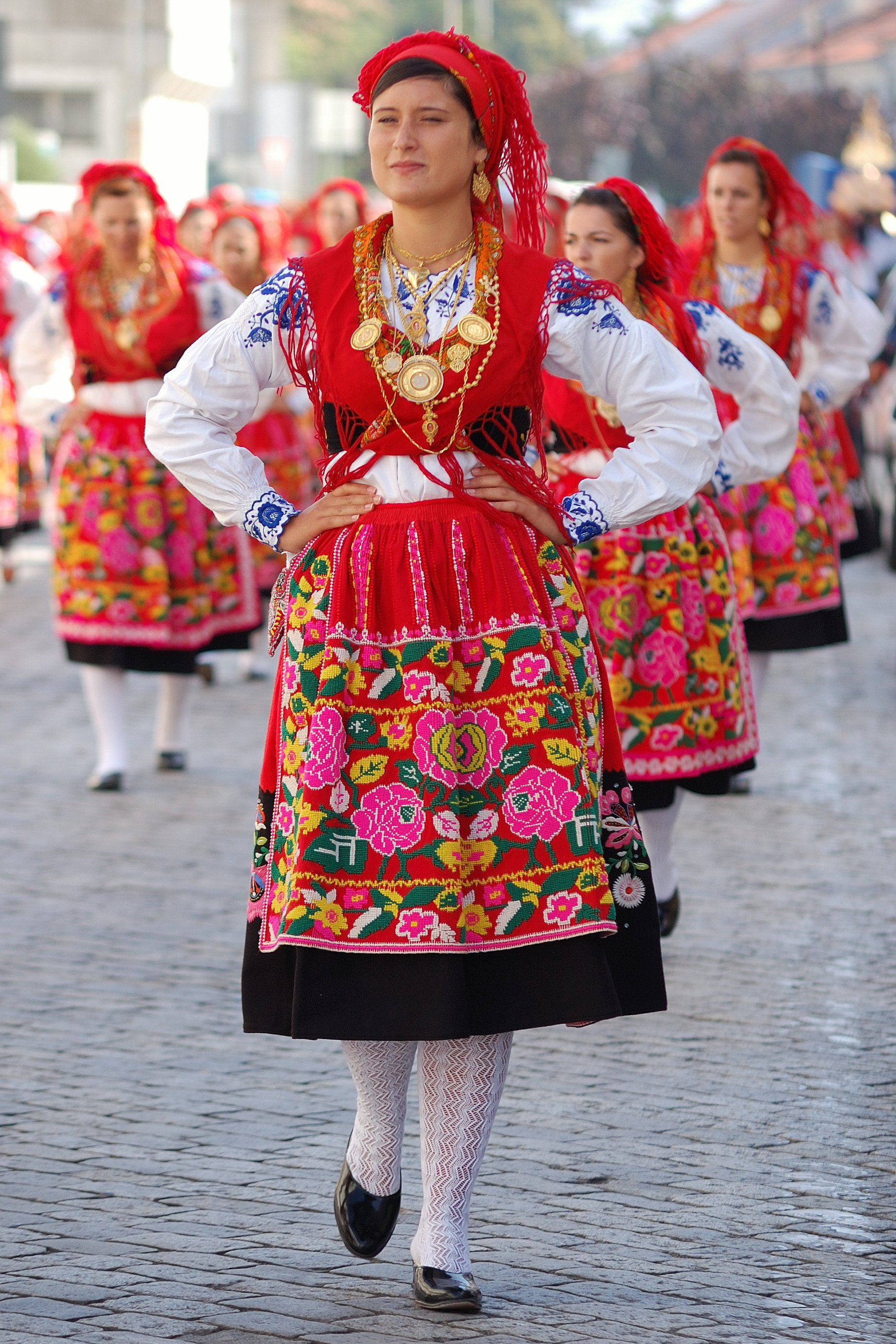
A procession of Our Lady of Agony (Senhora d'Agonia)

The Festa de Nossa Senhora d'Agonia (Festivity of Our Lady of Agony), is held in Viana do Castelo annually and it is one of Portugal's largest and oldest religious festivals. The event spans several days and includes a wide variety of activities, both religious and secular. These range from processions and ethnographic parades to performances featuring music, traditional dances, and large figures such as "cabeçudos" and "gigantones". Other attractions include a craft fair, fireworks displays, and musical concerts. The festivity has become an important cultural and economic event, stimulating tourism and local commerce.

Since 1985 the Teatro Sá de Miranda has been owned by the municipality, which has restored it to its former glory as one of the leading theatres in the provinces of Portugal. Viana do Castelo has the headquarters of Portugal's second oldest newspaper, A Aurora do Lima.

Viana do Castelo is renowned for its traditional pastries, such as the sidónio and the Torta de Viana. The sidónio, an almond-flavored pastry shaped like a coffin, is closely associated with the city's oldest bakery, Pastelaria Brasileira. Its name and design pay homage to Sidónio Pais, a prominent Portuguese statesman. The Torta de Viana, also known as Torta Real, is a sweet with origins dating back to 1505, linked to the Convent of Santa Ana in Viana do Castelo. It was historically reserved for special occasions and is recognized today as an iconic symbol of the city’s gastronomy. It was certified in 2021 to ensure adherence to its original recipe.

== Sport ==
SC Vianense is the local football club. Founded in 1898, it is one of the oldest clubs in Portugal. They play their home matches at the 3000 capacity Estádio do Dr. José de Matos.

== Notable people ==
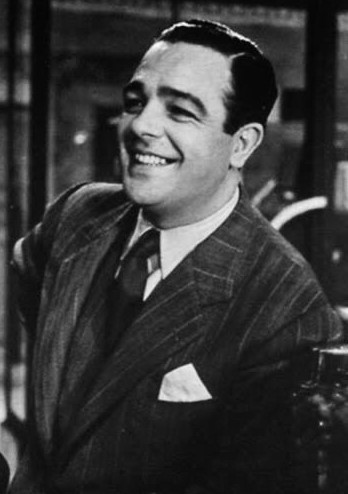
Óscar de Lemos, 1944

- Sofia Aparício (born 1970) a Portuguese model and actress.
- Pedro Manuel de Ataíde (1665–1722) an army officer and nobleman
- Luís do Rego Barreto (1777–1840) 1st Viscount of Geraz do Lima, a military officer and colonial administrator
- Caramuru (ca.1475-1557) helped the early colonization of Brazil by the Portuguese crown.
- Tânia Carvalho (born 1976) a choreographer and works in music, drawing and film.
- Joe Duarte (born 1941) a politician and former Republican member of the New Hampshire House of Representatives
- João Álvares Fagundes (ca.1460–1522) ship owner, explored Newfoundland & Nova Scotia.
- Óscar de Lemos (1906–1954) a Portuguese stage and film actor
- Sebastião Lopes de Calheiros e Meneses (1816–1899) a colonial administrator of Cape Verde and Angola.
- Paulo de Morais (born 1963) a professor and politician
- Francisco de Sá Noronha (1820–1881) a composer and violinist
- Luís Miguel Rocha (1976–2015) author, television writer and producer.
- Olga Roriz (born 1955) a dancer and choreographer
- João de Sousa (1666–1722) 3rd Marquis of Minas, nobleman and the 6th Count of Prado.
- Adriana de Vecchi (1896–1995) a cellist, Montessori-trained educator and founder of a Lisbon music school for children

=== Sport ===
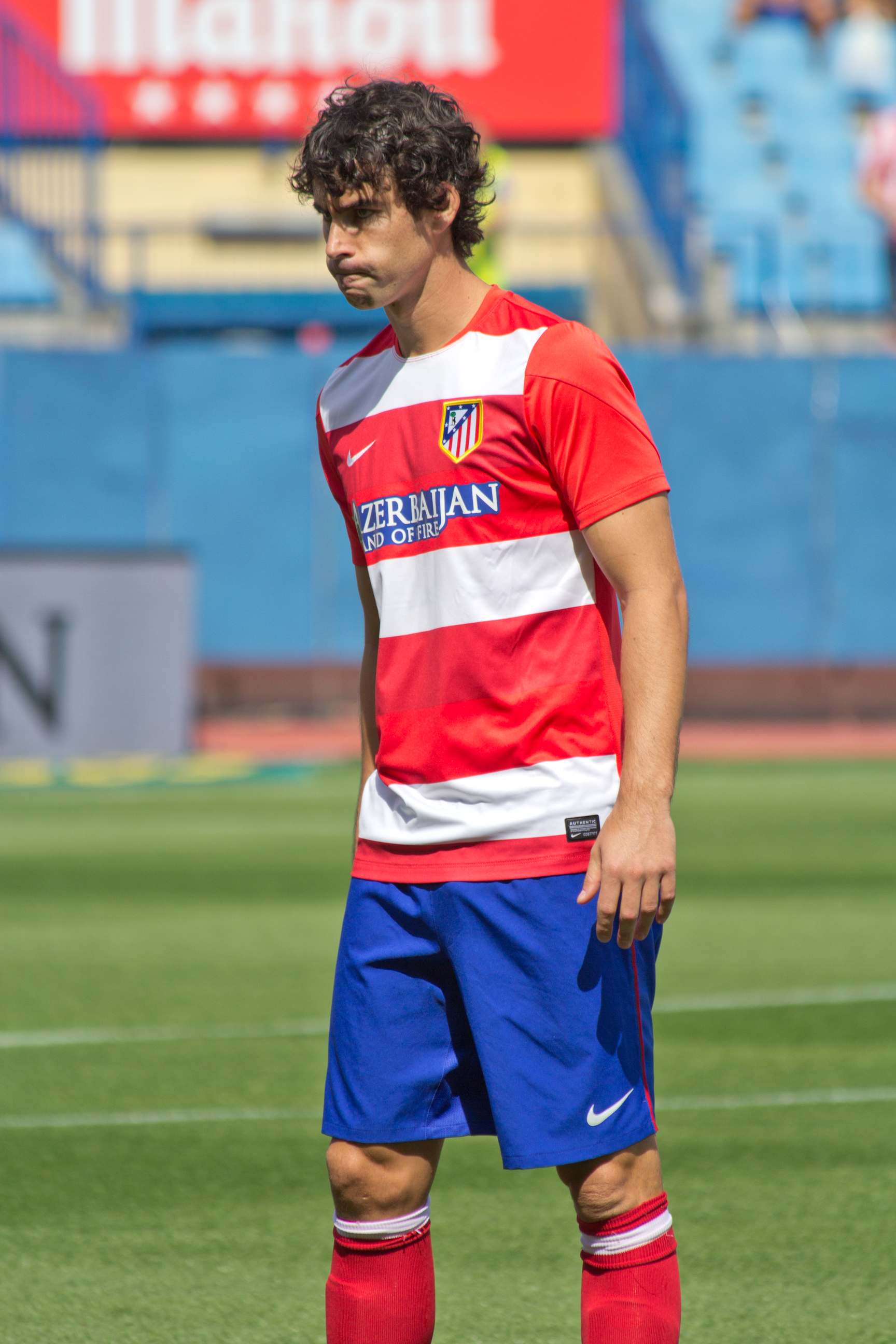
Tiago Mendes, 2013

- Jordão Cardoso (born 1996) a footballer
- Miguel Crespo (born 1996) a footballer
- Mário Felgueiras (born 1986) a former footballer
- César Fonte (born 1986) a cyclist
- Rogério Gonçalves (born 1959) a football manager
- Rui Lavarinhas (born 1971) a former cyclist
- Iúri Leitão (born 1998) a Portuguese road and track cyclist
- Nélson Lenho (born 1984) a former footballer with 358 club caps
- Manuela Machado (born 1963) a former long-distance runner
- Tiago Mendes (born 1981) a football manager and former player with 457 club caps and 66 for Portugal
- Martim Neto (born 2003) a footballer
- Pedro Neto (born 2000) footballer for Chelsea FC with 4 caps for Portugal
- Vânia Neves (born 1990) a swimmer
- João Queirós (born 1998) a footballer playing in the Armenian Premier League
- Rui Rêgo (born 1980) a former football goalkeeper with 538 club caps.
- Rodrigo Ribeiro (born 2005) a footballer
- Nuno Santos (born 1980) a former footballer with 389 club caps
- Chico Silva (born 1967) a former footballer who played for S.C. Braga
- Tomás Silva (born 1999) a footballer
- Analídia Torre (born 1976) a former long-distance runner, specialized in cross-country running.
- Francisco Trincão (born 1999) footballer for Sporting CP with 7 caps for Portugal

== International relations ==
Viana do Castelo is a member of Cittaslow.

Viana do Castelo is twinned with:

- Alagoas, Brazil
- Aveiro, Portugal
- Cabedelo, Brazil
- Hendaye, France
- Igarassu, Brazil
- Itajaí, Brazil
- Lancaster, England
- Lugo, Spain
- Matola, Mozambique
- Pessac, France
- Porto Seguro, Brazil
- Ribeira Grande, Cape Verde
- Rio de Janeiro, Brazil
- Riom, France
- Viana, Brazil

== Gallery ==
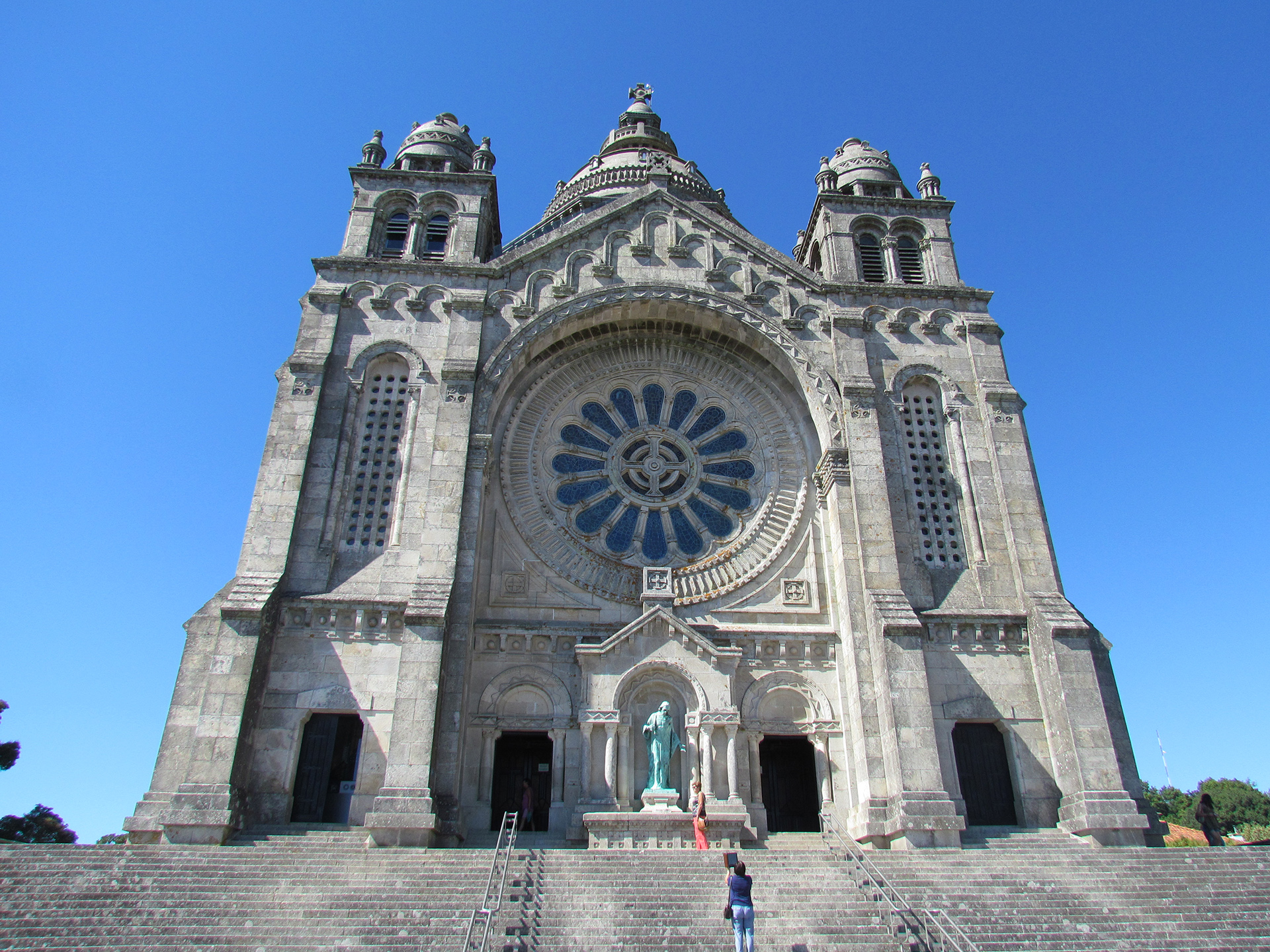
Sanctuary of the Sacred Heart of Jesus

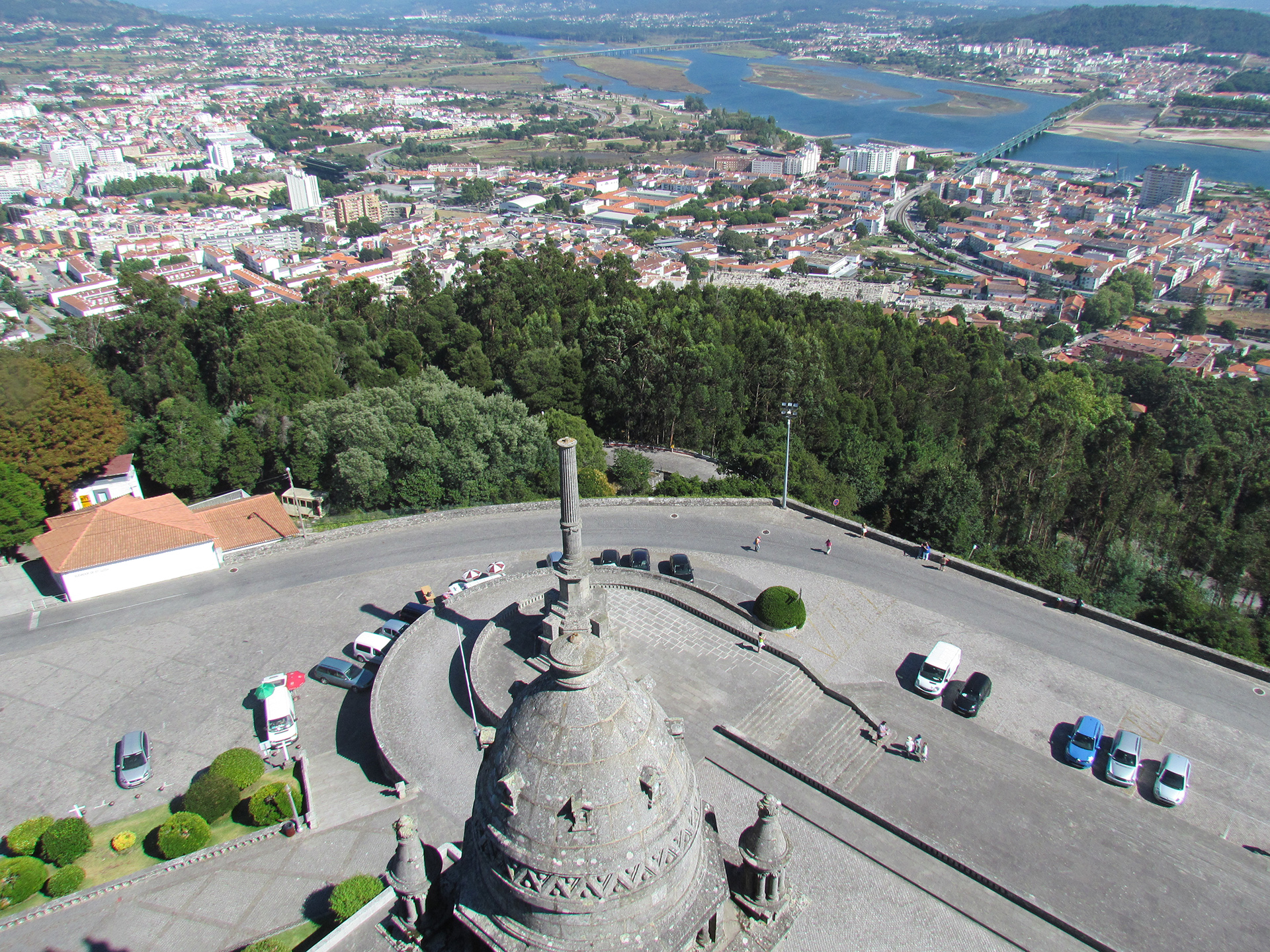
City view from the top of the sanctuary of the Sacred Heart of Jesus

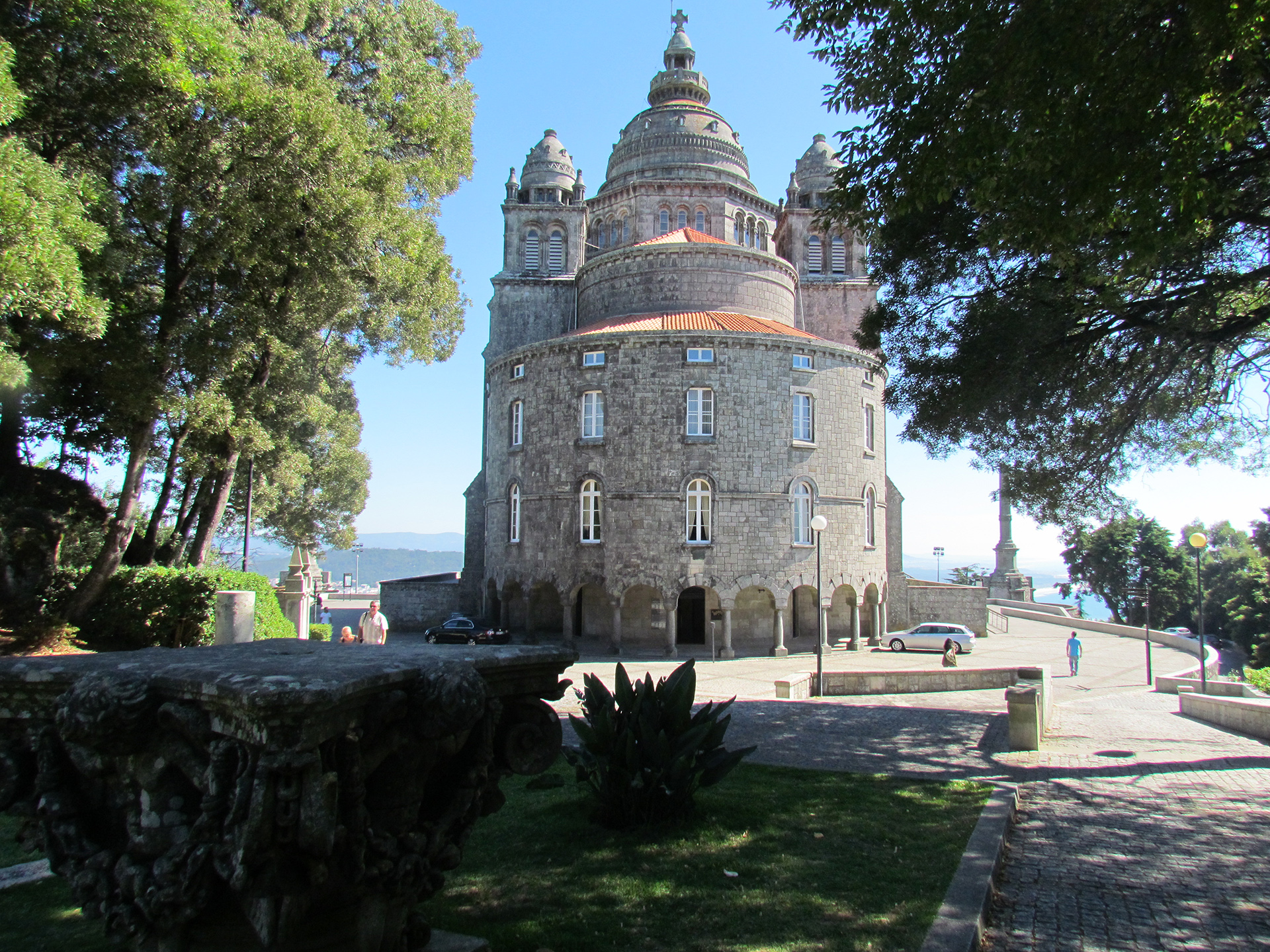
Sanctuary of the Sacred Heart of Jesus

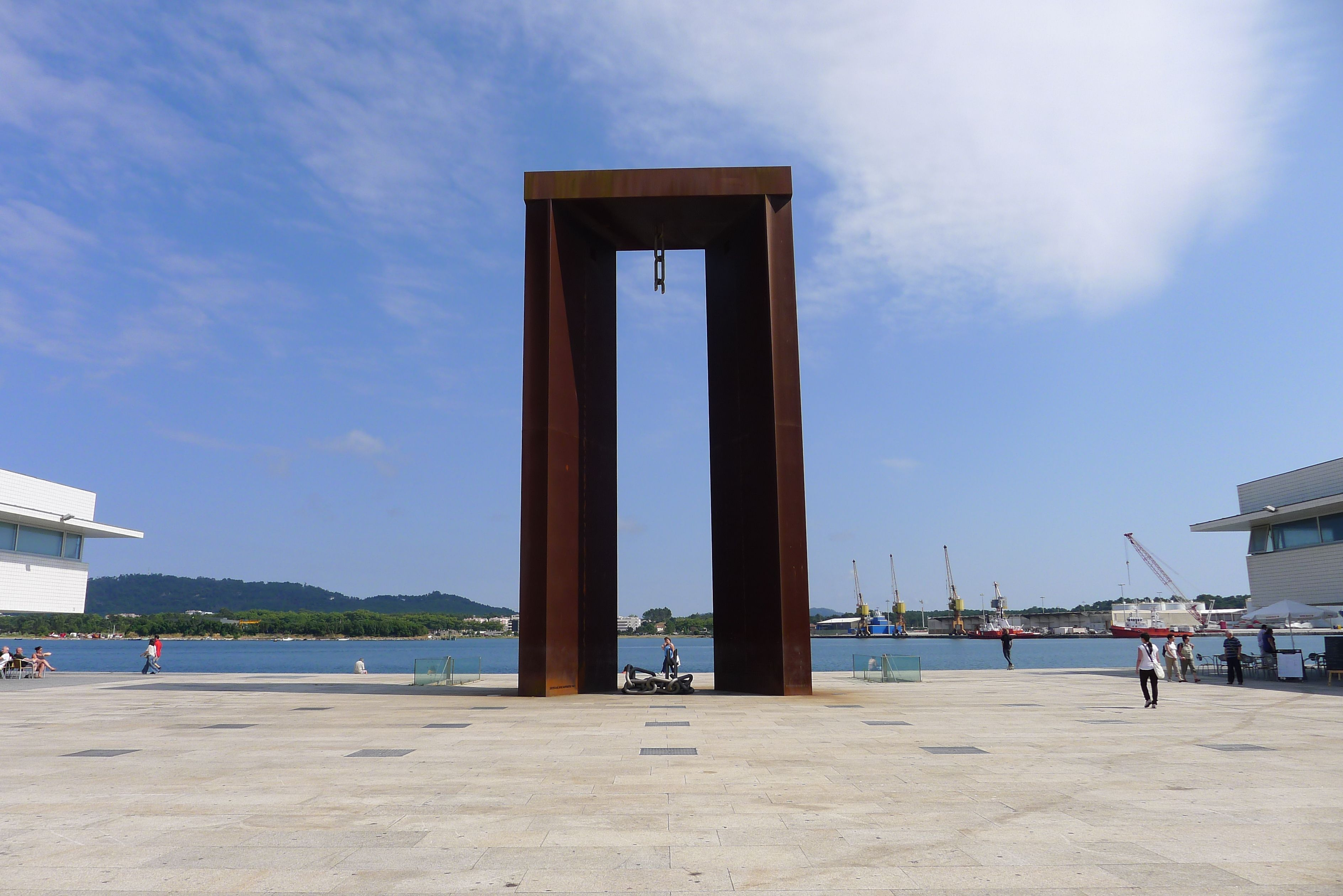
Monument to the 25th of April

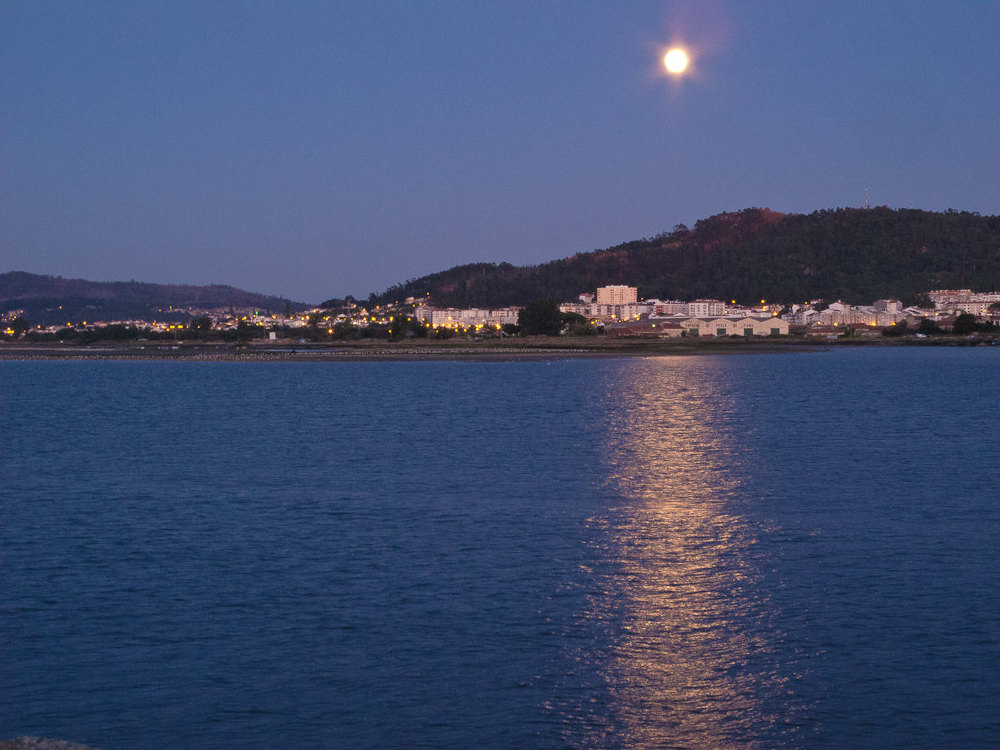
Viana do Castelo, Portugal

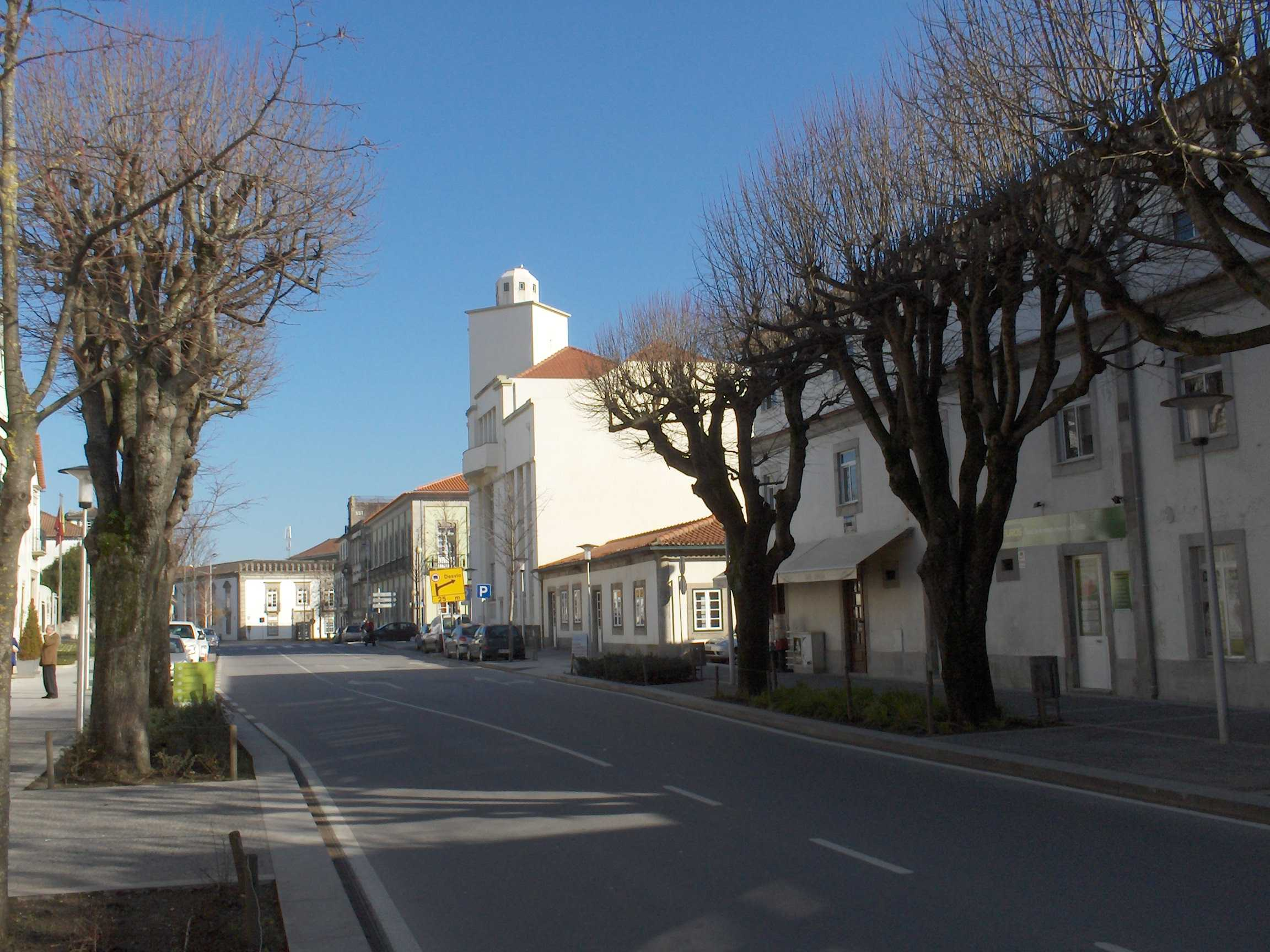
Viana do Castelo, Portugal

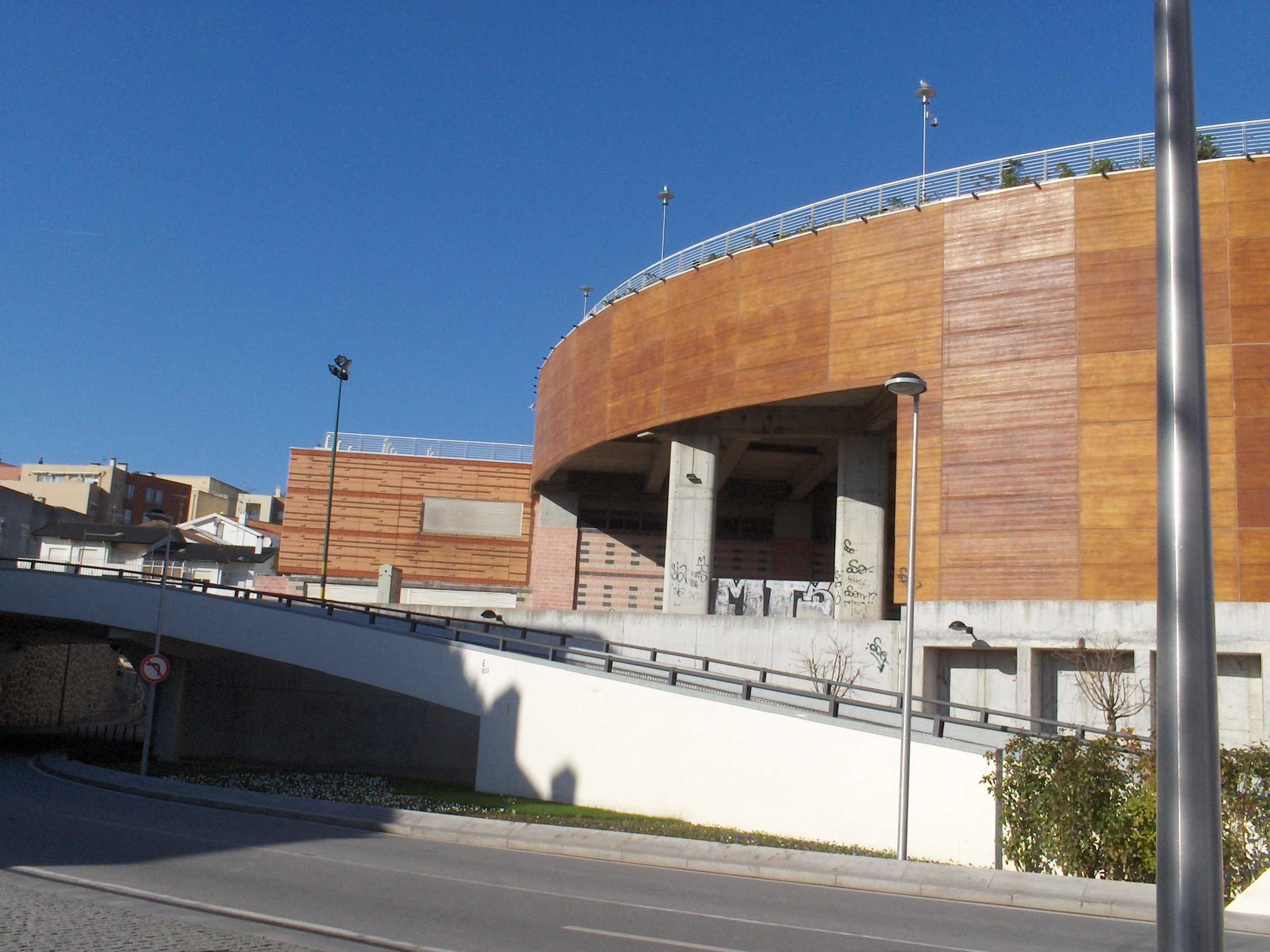
Viana do Castelo, Portugal

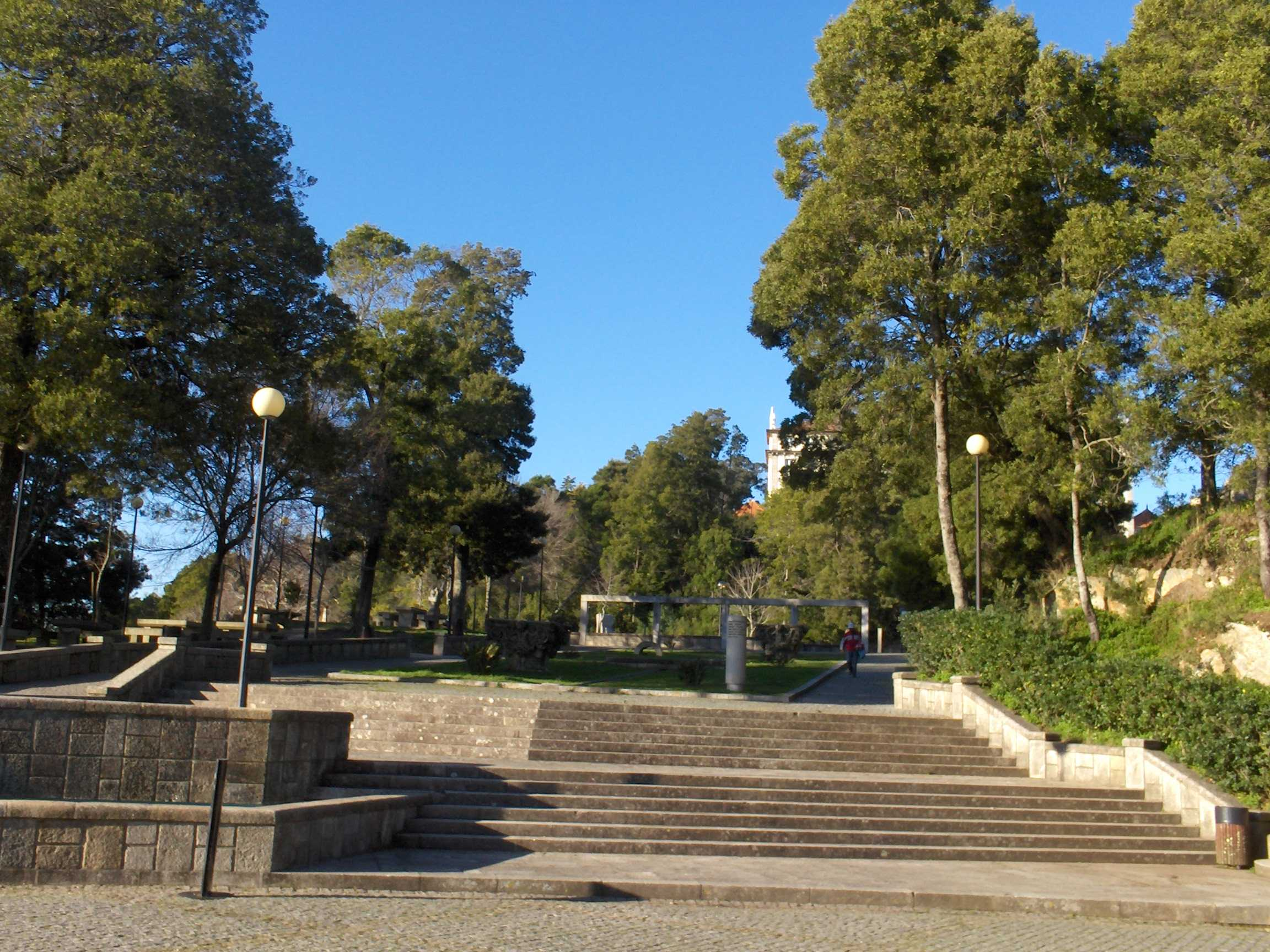
Viana do Castelo, Portugal

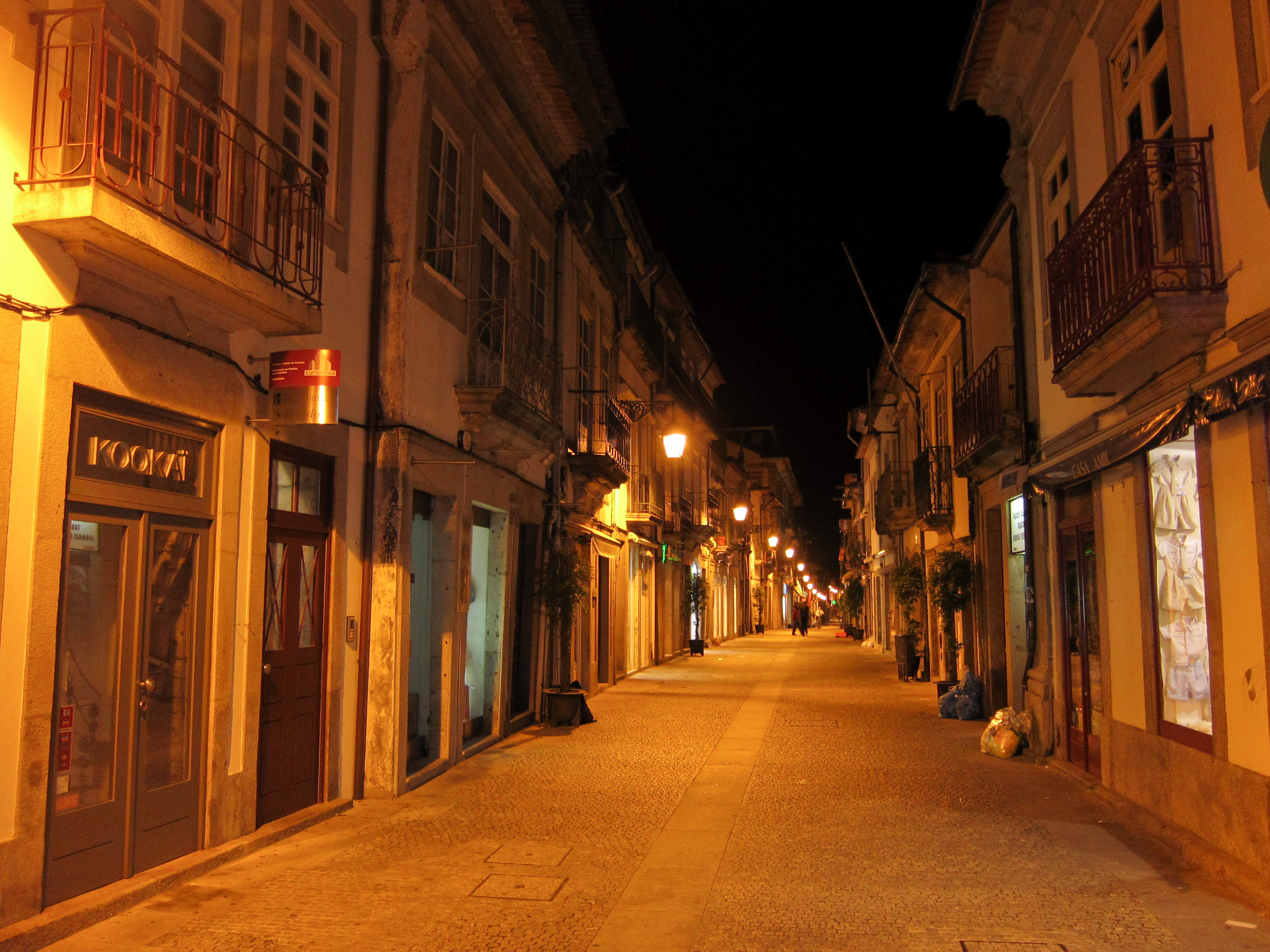
Viana do Castelo, Portugal

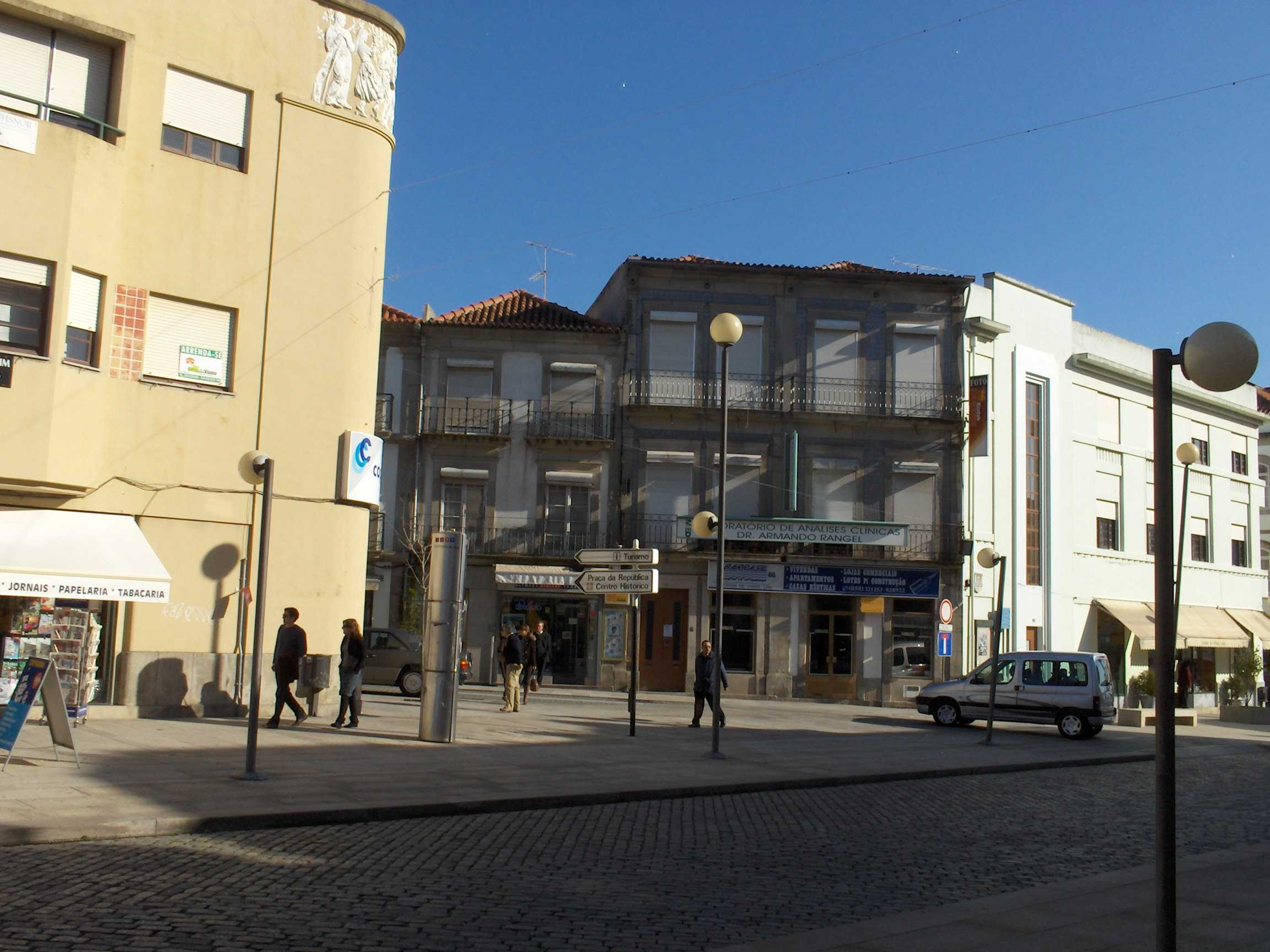
Avenida dos Combatentes da Grande Guerra (Avenue of Combatants of the Great War)

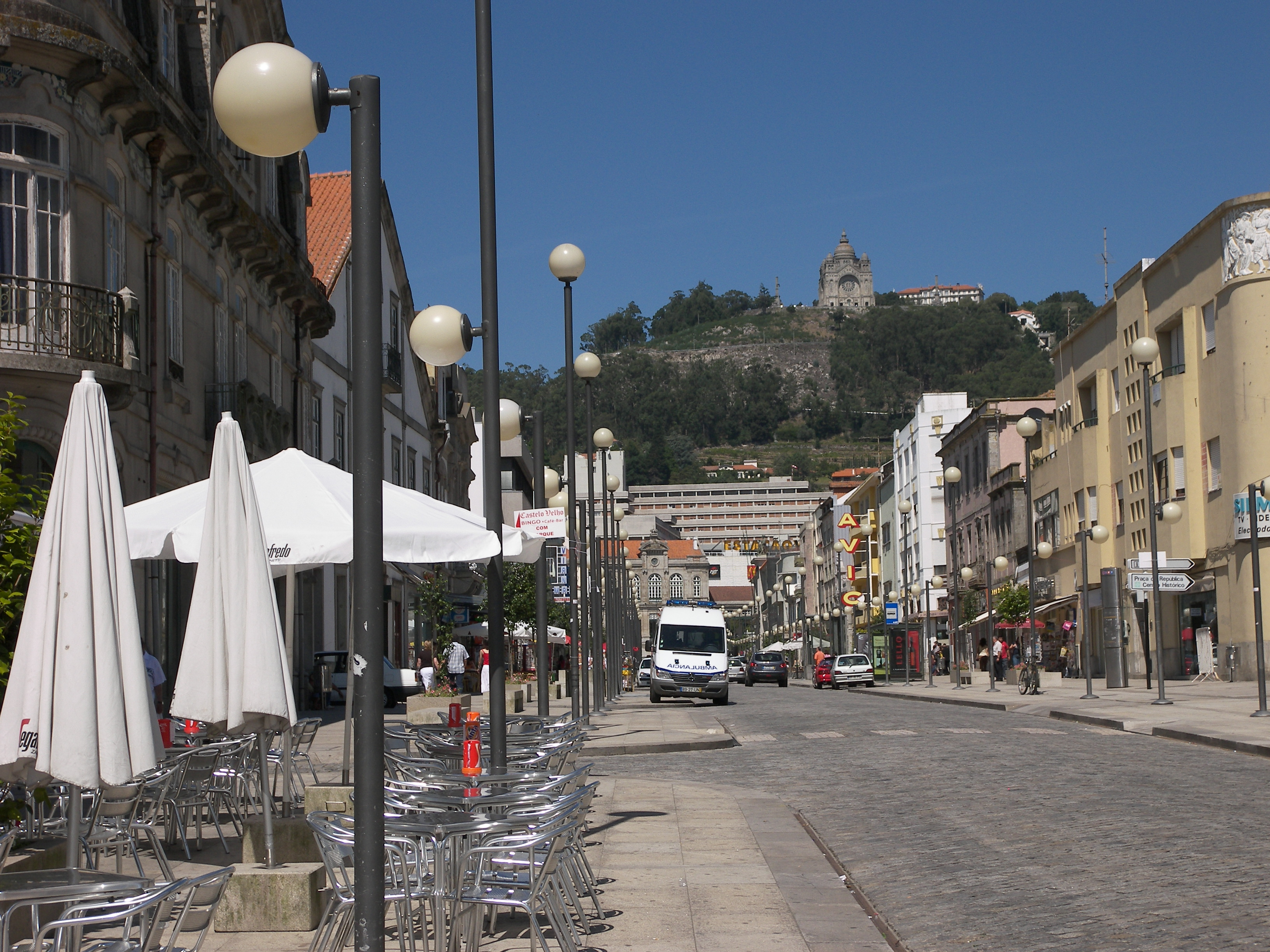
Avenida dos Combatentes da Grande Guerra (Avenue of Combatants of the Great War)

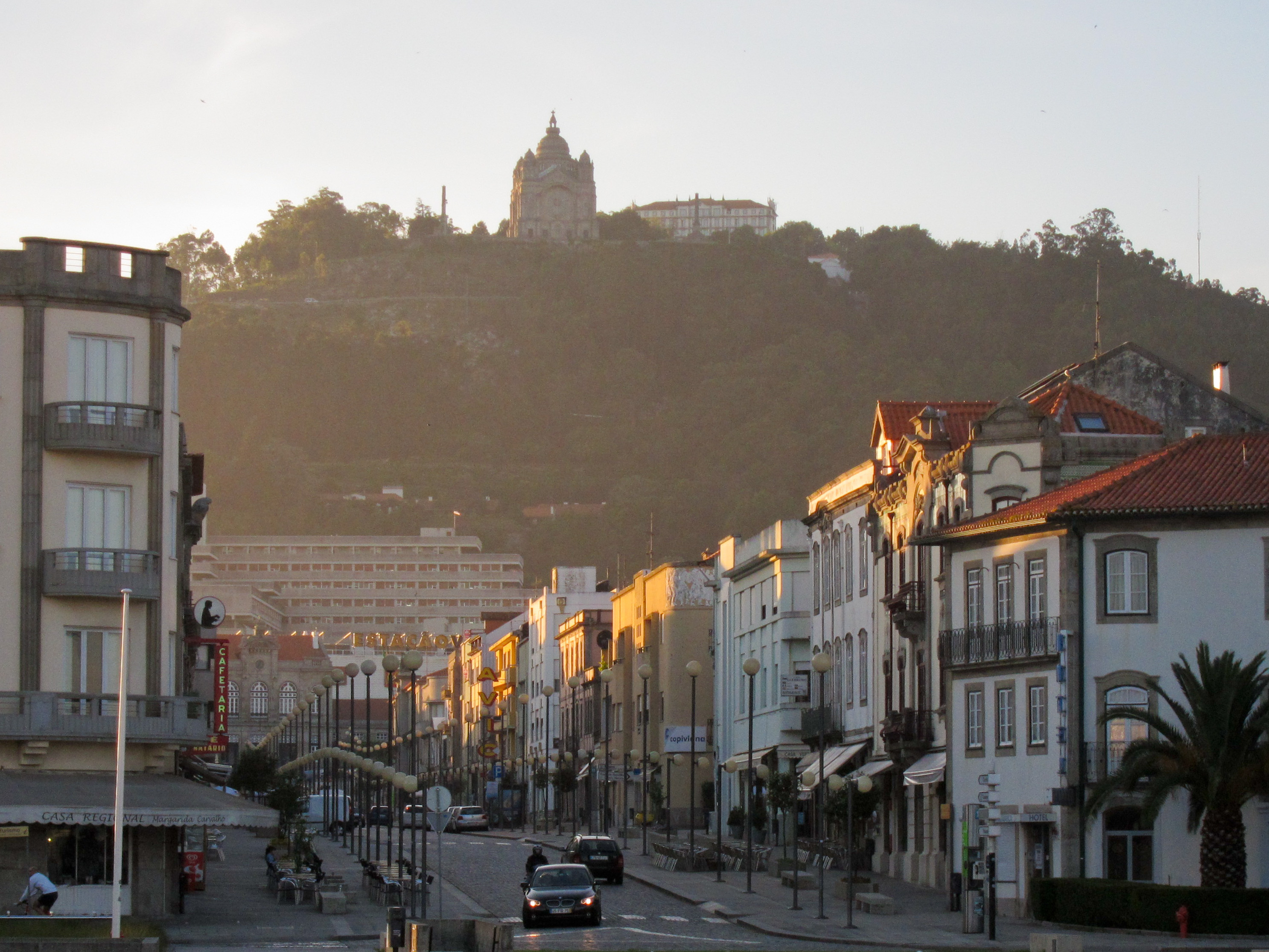
Avenida dos Combatentes da Grande Guerra (Avenue of Combatants of the Great War)

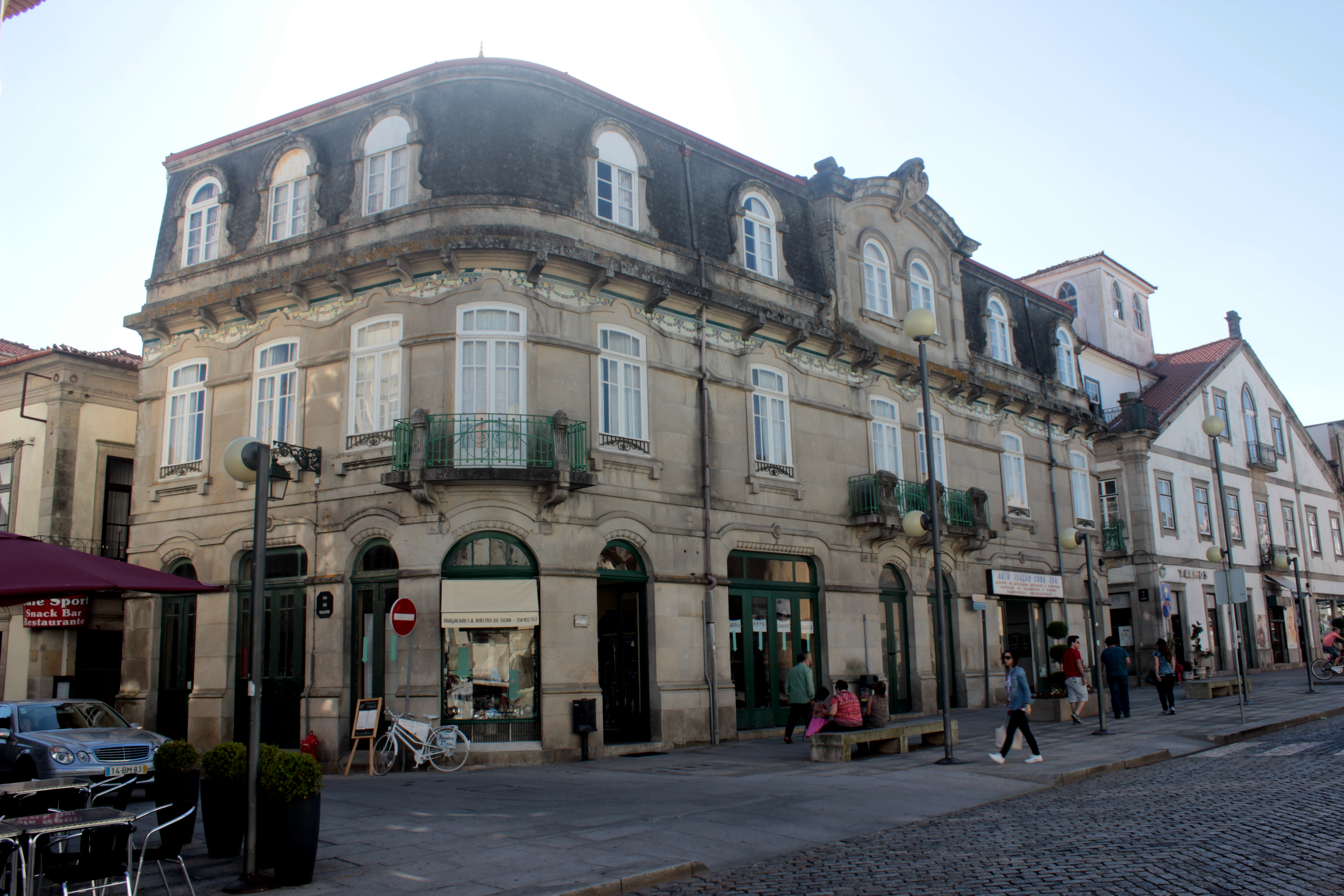
Avenida dos Combatentes da Grande Guerra (Avenue of Combatants of the Great War)

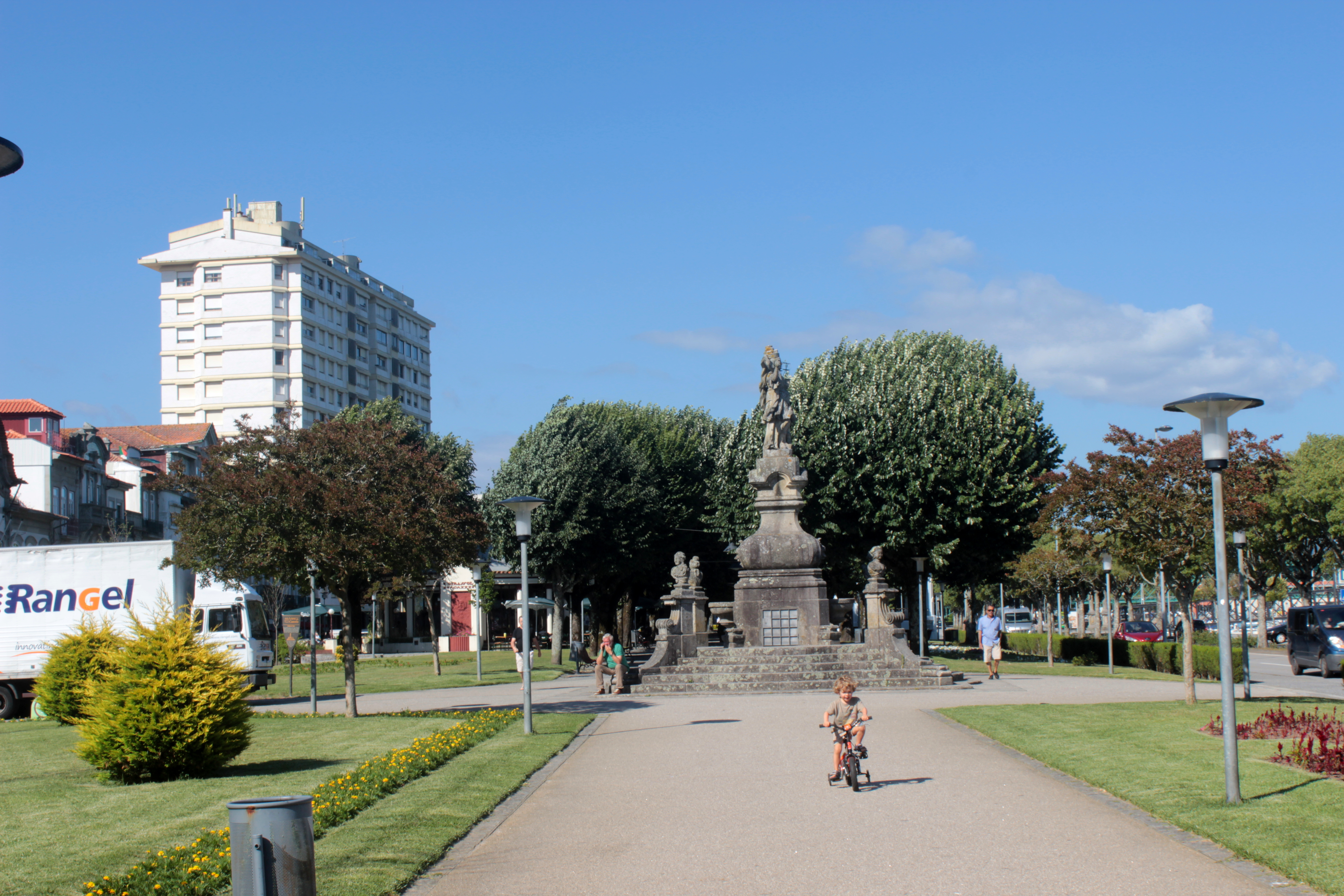
Viana do Castelo, Portugal
