= Chafé =

- Civil parish
- Location in Portugal
- Coordinates: 41.649°N 8.784°W
- Country: Portugal
- Region: Norte
- Intermunic. comm.: Alto Minho
- District: Viana do Castelo
- Municipality: Viana do Castelo

Area
  - Total: 7.85 km^{2} (3.03 sq mi)

Population (2021)
  - Total: 3,447
  - Density: 440/km^{2} (1,100/sq mi)
- Time zone: UTC+00:00 (WET)
  - Summer (DST): UTC+01:00 (WEST)

Chafé is a civil parish in the municipality of Viana do Castelo, Portugal. The population in 2011 was 2,841, in an area of 7.85 km^{2}. It is located near the Atlantic coast, 7 km south of Viana do Castelo, Portugal, 59 km north of Porto.
