= Fort Santiago da Barra =

- Forte de Santiago da Barra
- Viana do Castelo, Portugal
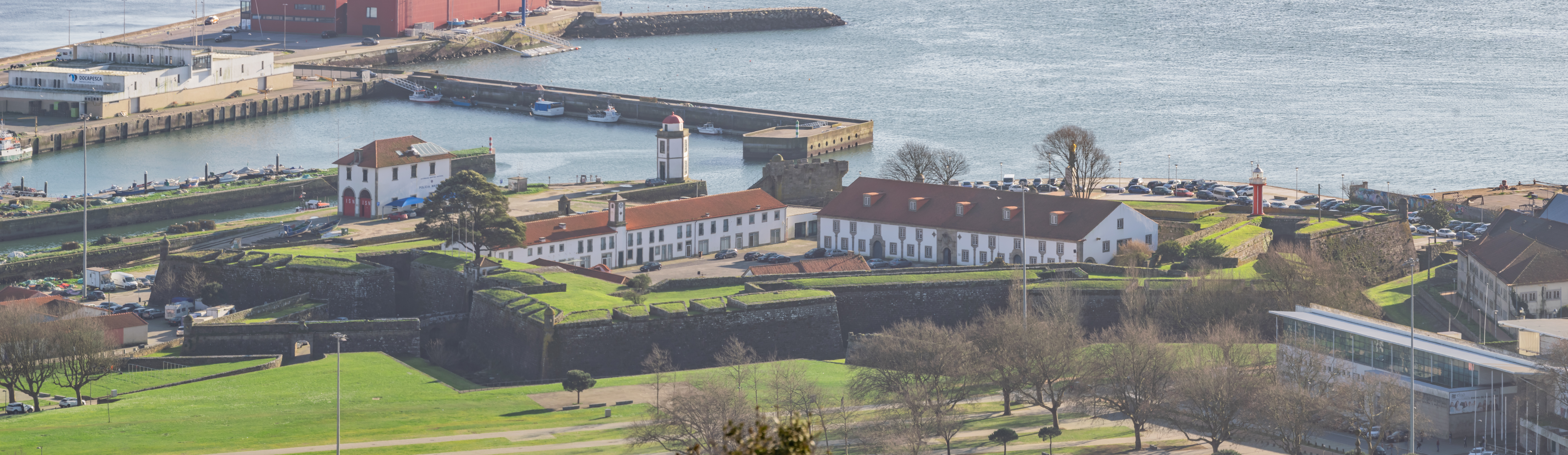

Site information
- Type: Bastion fort
- Open to the public: Yes
- Condition: Good

Location
- Coordinates: 41°41′20″N 8°50′20″W

Site history
- In use: 16th-19th century.
- Events: Portuguese Restoration War; Peninsular War; Portuguese Civil War

The Fort Santiago da Barra de Viana do Castelo (Forte de Santiago da Barra in Portuguese) also referred to as Castle Santiago da Barra (Castelo de Santiago da Barra in Portuguese) and Castle São Tiago Maior da Barra (Castelo de São Tiago Maior da Barra in Portuguese) is located in the parish of Santa Maria Maior, Monserrate, and Meadela, in the city of Viana do Castelo in Portugal.

In a dominant position on the right bank of the bar of the river Lima, its purpose was to defend the anchorage and village of Viana da Foz, now the city of Viana do Castelo.

It was once one of the most important fortresses in the northwestern coast of Portugal. It is classified as a Property of Public Interest by Decree published on January 24, 1967.

The Viana do Castelo Hotel and Tourism School founded in 2007 currently operates in the fort.

== History ==
King Afonso III of Portugal (1248–1279) founded the town of Viana, granting it a Charter in 1258, later confirmed in 1262. Aiming at the defense and development of that stretch of coastline, by promoting mercantile and fishing activities, its inhabitants were granted tributary privileges, with the duty to defend the mouth of the river Lima.

The defensive perimeter of the nascent town, into which the keep was inscribed, included walls: its limits are unknown today, but it is believed that they were completed at the end of the 14th century, when it became a flourishing borough.

In the mid-15th century, Viana da Foz do Lima became one of the country's major seaports, maintaining trade with ports in Galicia, France and Flanders. The resulting prosperity materialized in the increase of the population and the urban fabric, surpassing the primitive medieval walls.

=== The Roqueta Tower ===
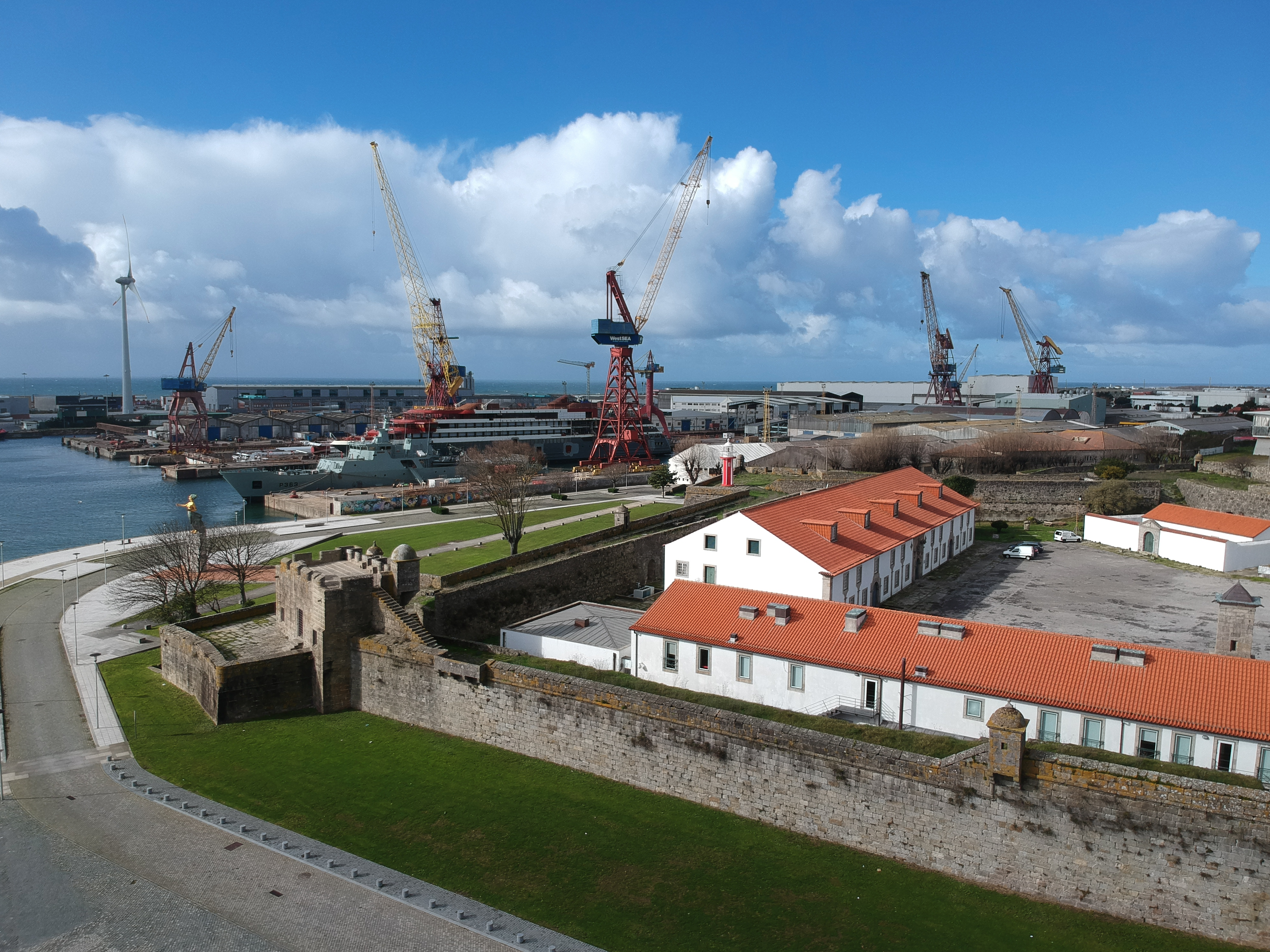
Riverside bastion, incorporating the Roqueta Tower.

Once sea route to India was opened, in order to protect navigation on the Lima mouth, around 1502 King Manuel I (1495–1521) determined the construction of a bastioned tower, in the countryside of Santa Catarina, west end of the village called Roqueta Tower. It was similar to the Cascais Bastion (began in 1498), and it would anticipate the Belém Tower (built in 1515) defending of the mouth of the Tagus. Its name may have been derived from stone-shooting artillery pieces. This early structure had a bulwark facing the river Lima, later demolished.

=== The Viana Fort ===
The necessity of defending the rivermouth led to the need for modernization and expansion of the fortification. Thus, between 1567 or and 1568 (depending on the source), when the town of Viana had already received the title of "notable", by orders of the city council a small rectangular fort was initiated next to Roqueta Tower, which took advantage of the old Manueline fortification as the southwest corner of its wall. This work was completed under the reign of King Sebastian (1554–1578), in 1572.

=== The Fort Santiago ===
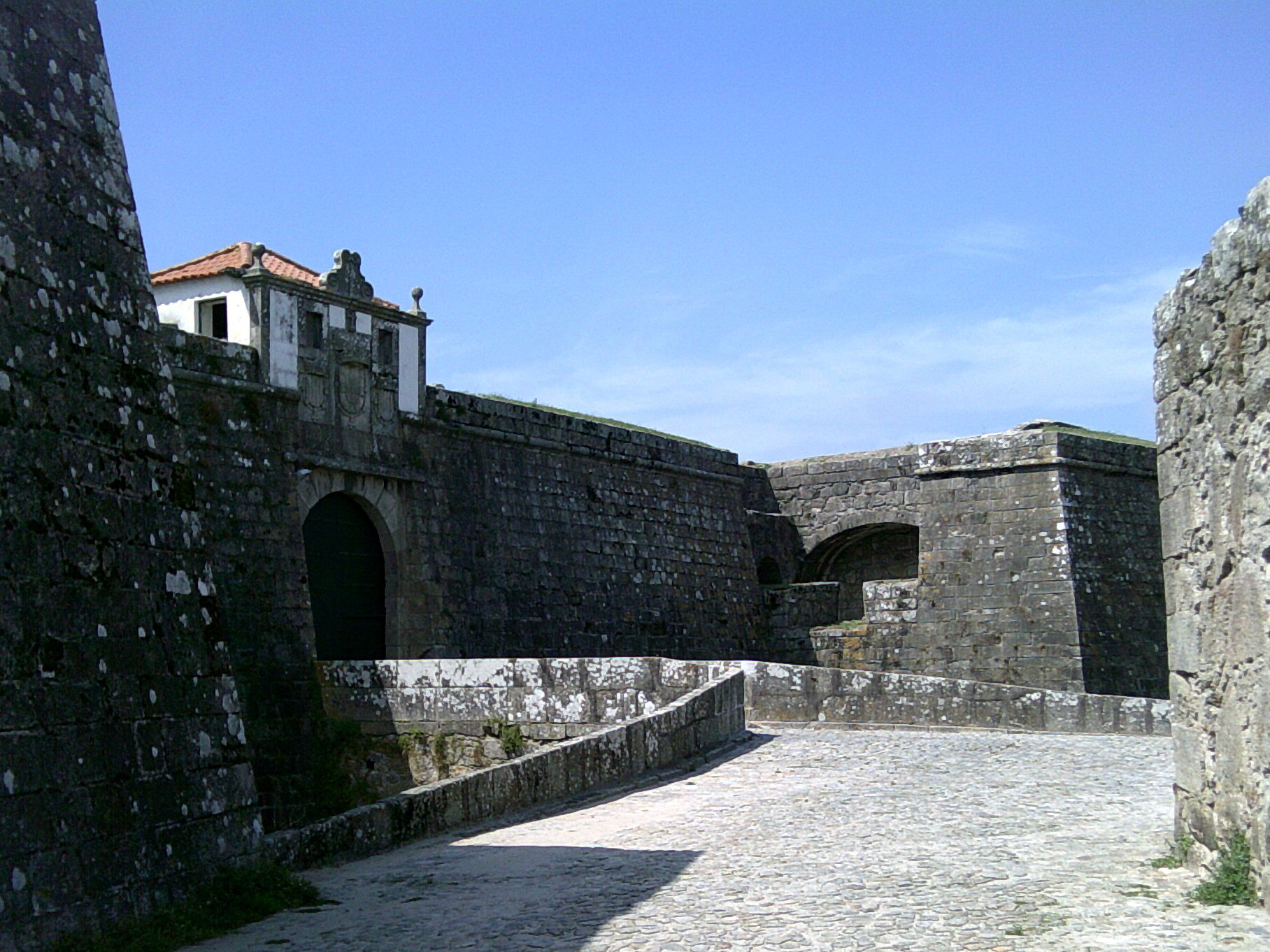
Gateway.

Under the Habsburg Dynasty, during the reign of Philip I of Portugal (1580–1598), the Viana fort was completely remodeled and expanded, designed by the Italian military engineer and architect Filippo Terzi (1520–1597). Its works began in 1589, and the master-of-the-field, Dom Pedro Bermudes de Santisso mobilized the peasants to transport the stone needed for the building, and was completed in 1596 according to a stone inscription on the fort placed by orders of Dom Pedro Bermudes.

In 1640, with the Restoration of independence, the population of the town flocked to the fort, surrounding it and forcing the capitulation of the Spanish garrison, whose commander was Don Bernardin Polano y Santillana. In the context of the War of Restoration, it saw renovation works and additions being made between 1652 and 1654, at the behest of Dom Diogo de Lima, Viscount of Vila Nova da Cerveira and Governor-of-Arms of Entre-Douro-e-Minho, who added the bulwark São Pedro. Improvement works would continue until 1799.

Later, in 1700, when the town prospered with the export of wines from the Douro region to centers such as Dunkirk, Rouen, Venice, England, Sweden and even Russia, the defenses were added with ravelins and a moat on the land side. In 1745 the city hall authorizes the establishment of a military brotherhood in the chapel of the fort. Reinforcement and modernization works were promoted in 1799.

In the late 17th century and early 18th, King Peter II of Portugal determined the construction of four new forts to help defend the region from pirate attacks, in addition to Fort Santiago da Barra: Lagarteira Fort, Cão Fort, Paçô Fort, and Rego Fort.

After participating in the Peninsular War, during the Portuguese Civil War (1828–1834), the fort saw action during the Maria da Fonte Revolt in 1846. It sheltered the Infantry Regiment nº3, which refused to join the revolt; the fort was besieged by forces of the Junta of Porto on February 28, which had revolted against the ruling regime, and on April 7 the garrison was allowed to abandon the fort and withdraw to Lisbon.

After the Ministry of Defence withdrew from the fort the Battalion of Caçadores 9 in 1978, the fort was transferred to the Ministry of Finance in 1979. From 1983 onwards, the extinct Alto Minho Tourism Region was installed in the fort, and in 2021 it became the headquarters of Turismo Porto e Norte. The Hotel School of Viana do Castelo also operates in the space, founded in 2007.

In 2021, a plan for the recovery of the fort is being prepared, which provides for the recovery of the building, the creation of a tourist circuit for visitation and the installation of an interpretive center for the Caminhos de Santiago.

== Features ==
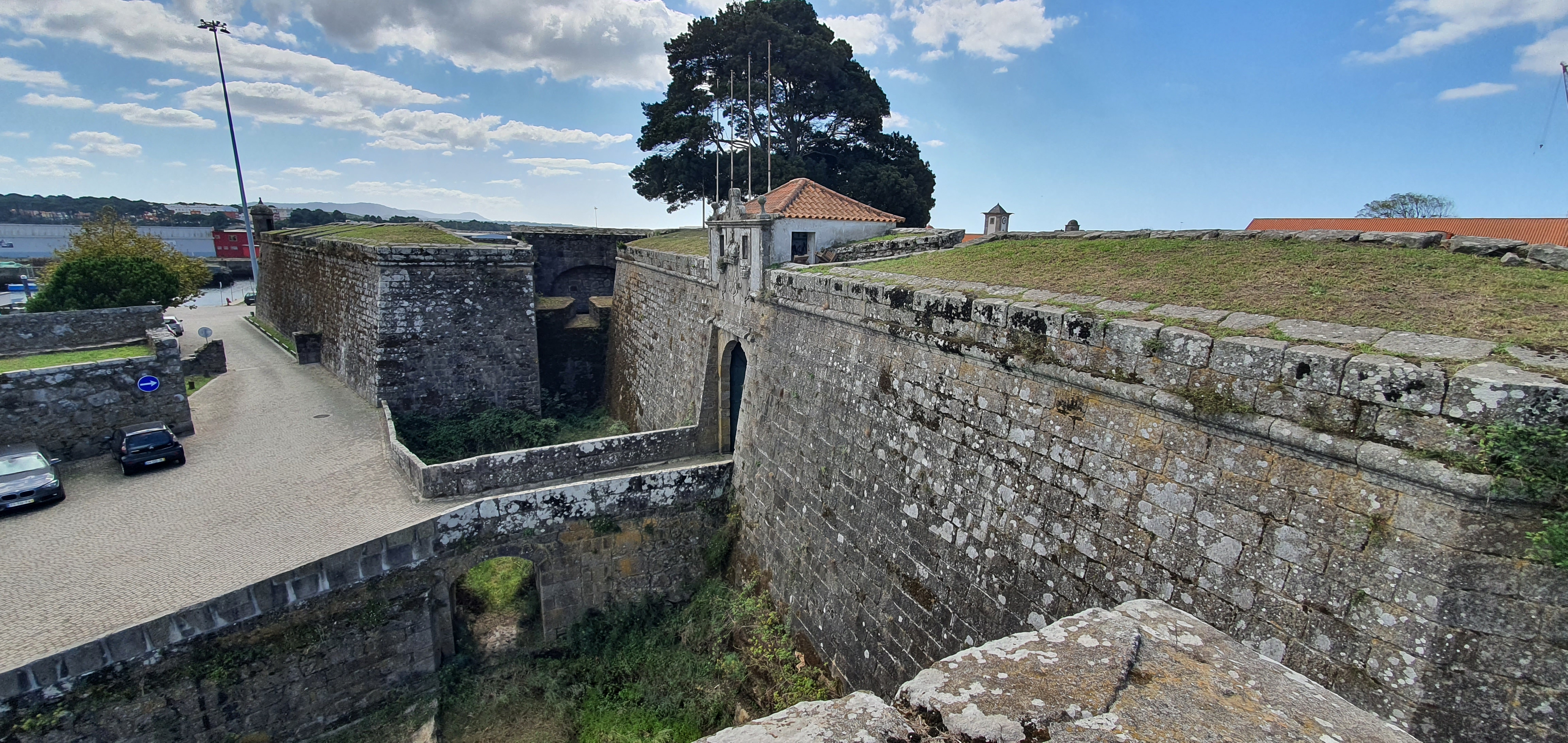
Entrance to the fort.

The Fort of Santiago has a pentagon shape, consisting of walls with a trapezoid profile, reinforced by triangular bulwarks at the corners facing the earth, with sentry boxes with a circular plan at the corners. The entrance to the fortress is made by a wide bridge over the moat that surrounds it, leading to a portal with a perfect arch flanked by pilasters, topped by the coat of arms of D. João de Sousa, governor of the fort in 1700, and topped on the cornice by the coat of arms of Portugal.

On the courtyard, accessed by a vaulted corridor, stands a main building, with a rectangular plan with three registers with an elevation rhythmic by three portals, the main building framed by a perfect round arch topped with a cartouche and flanked by columns topped by balusters in half relief, topped by the royal arms of Portugal. The side portals have a perfect arch frame without decoration. Windows were opened along the entire façade in both sides. The building also has mansard windows. To the north is the Chapel of Saint James, with a longitudinal plan, with a rectangular chancel and frontispiece ending in a gable, with a bell tower on the right. In front of it is the magazine, a quadrangular building with a register, with a perfect back portal surmounted by the coat of arms of Portugal and topped with a triangular gable.

Integrated in the southwest area of the fortress, located on a terrace that forms in the second plan, stands the so-called Roqueta Tower, with entry through the battlements, through a ramp. Flanked on the outside by four small towers and surrounded by a small moat, the Roqueta has a rectangular body with two registers, a terrace with adarves and the coat of arms of King Manuel sculpted on the façade.

== Gallery ==
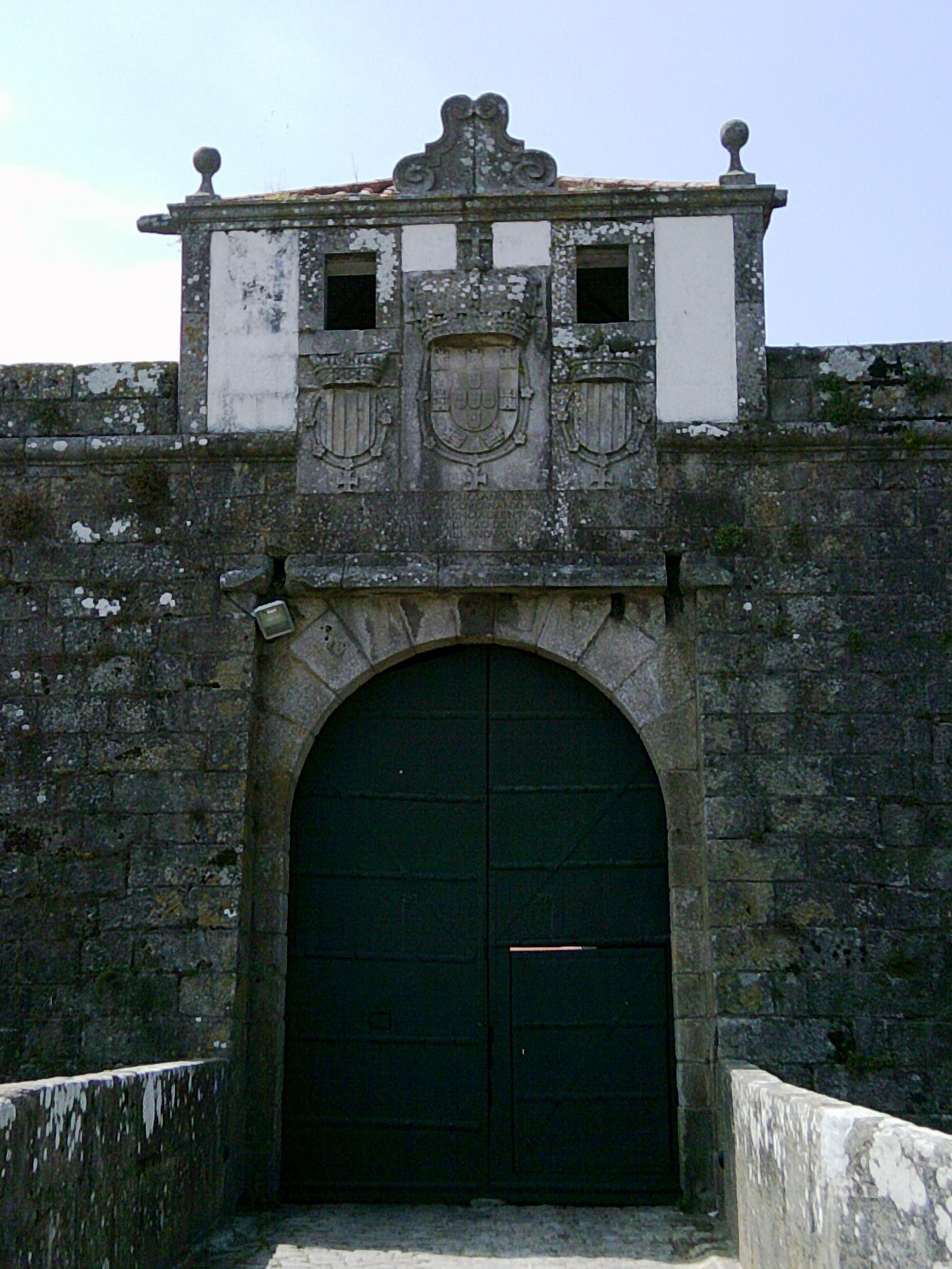
Gate-of-arms.

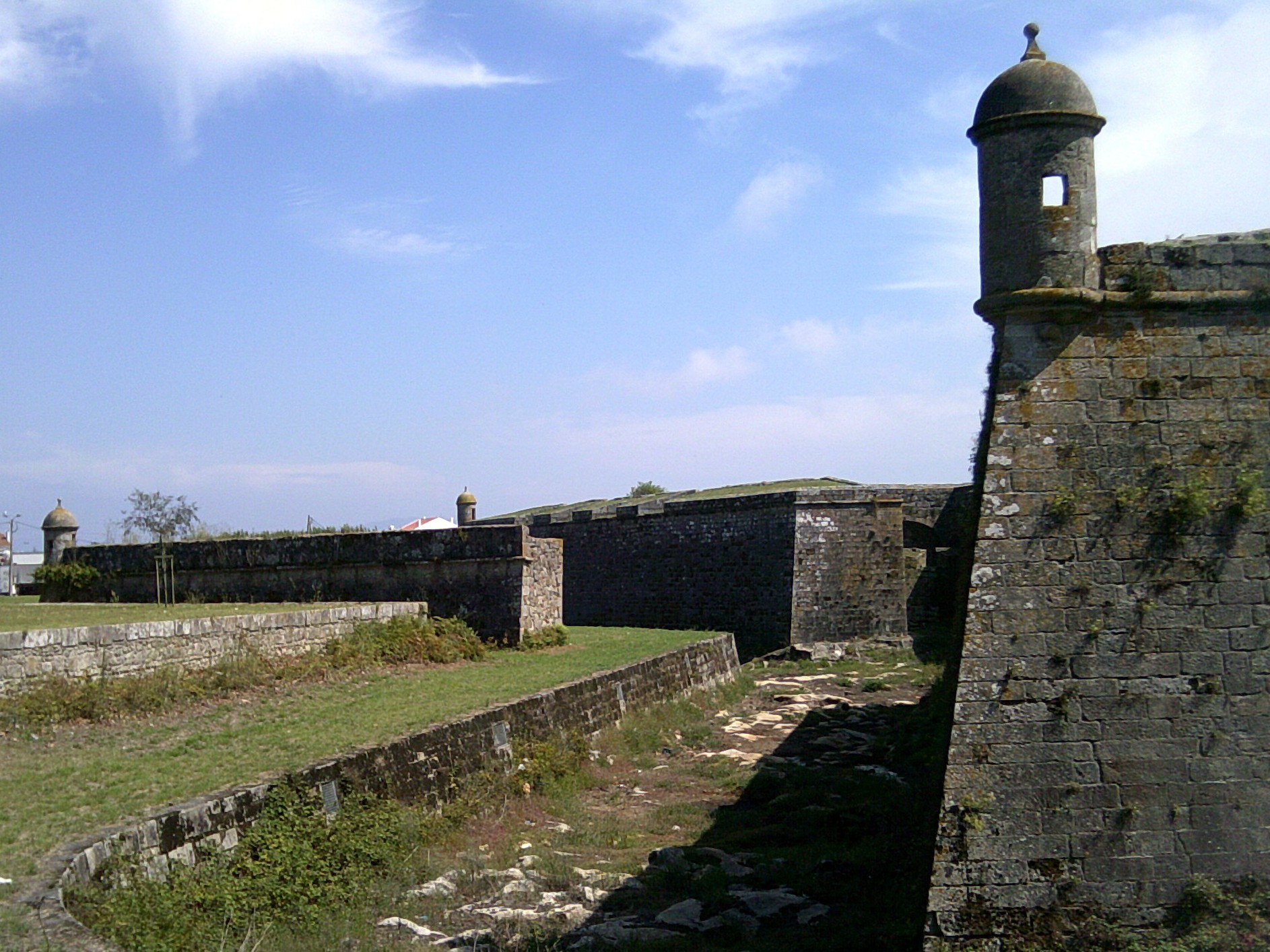
Moat and bastions.

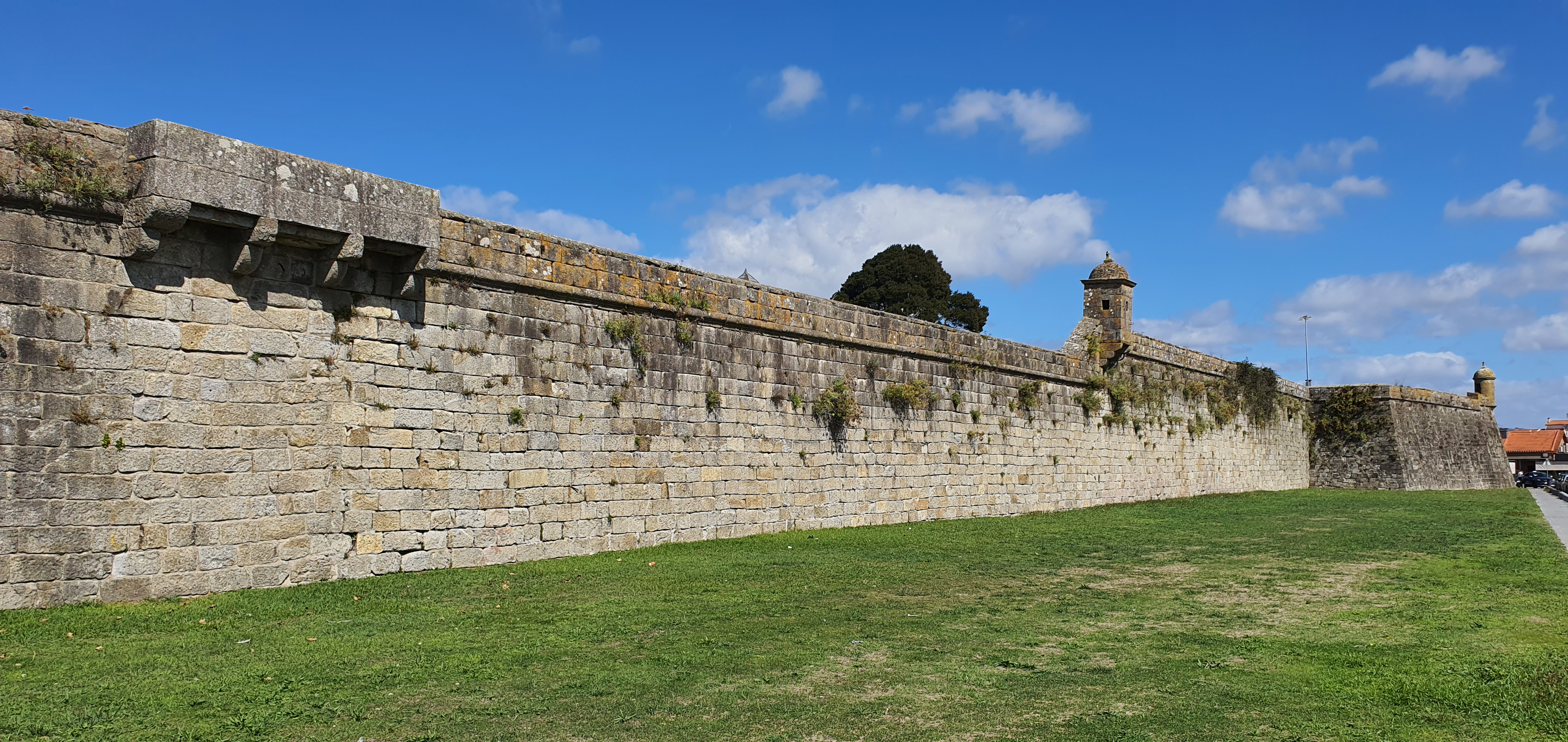
Walls.

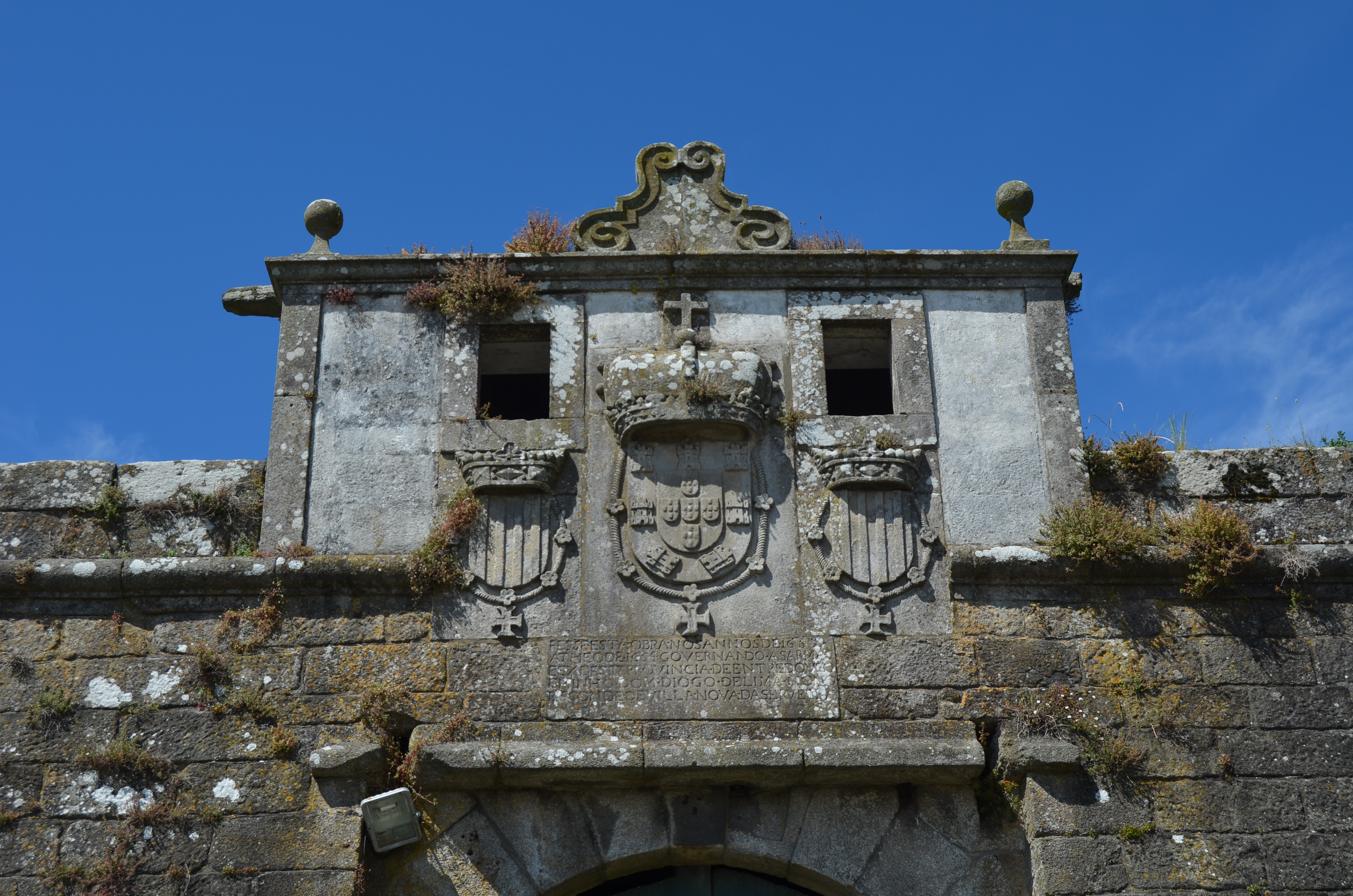
Stones-of-arms.

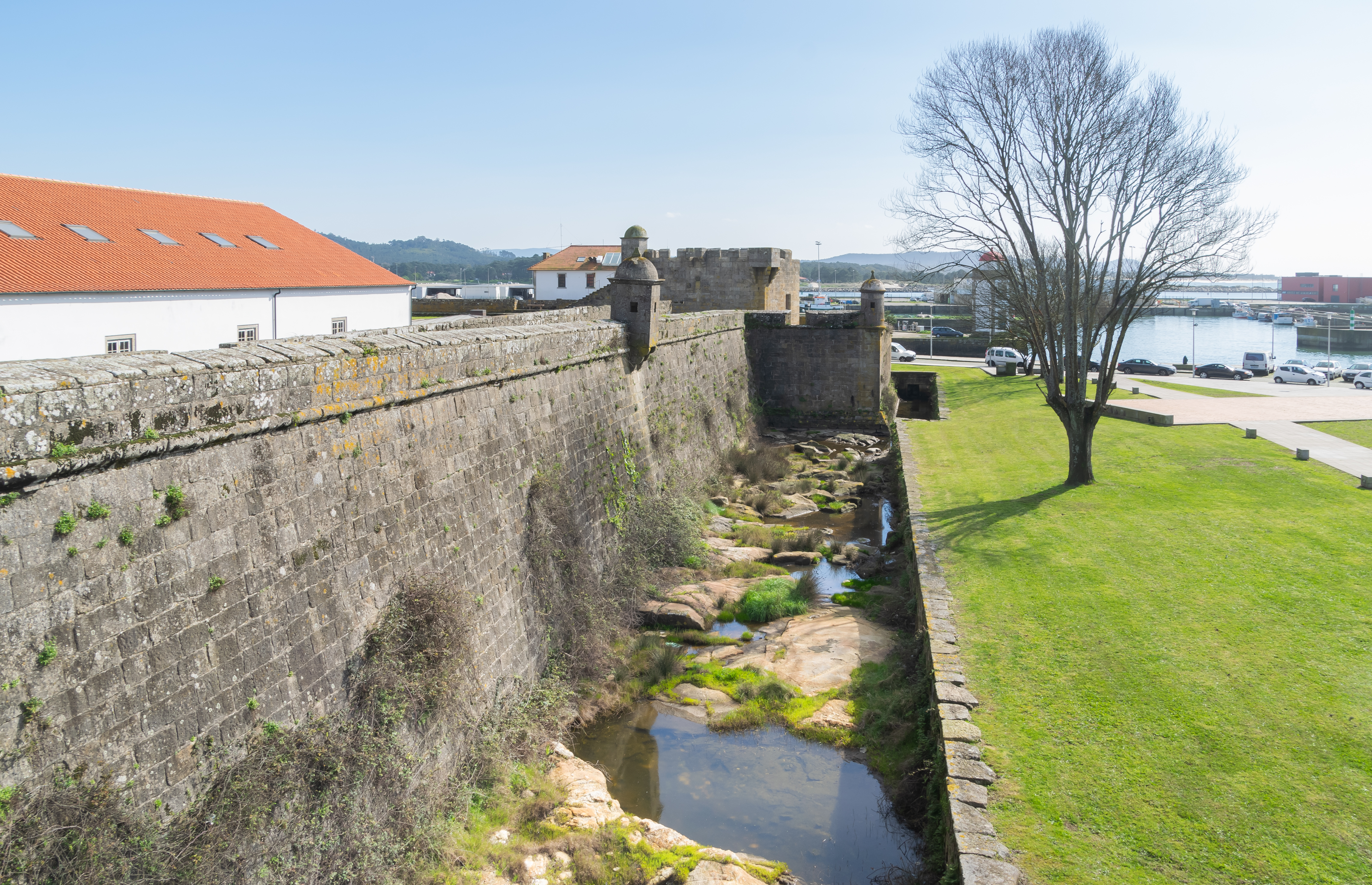
Riverside moat and walls.

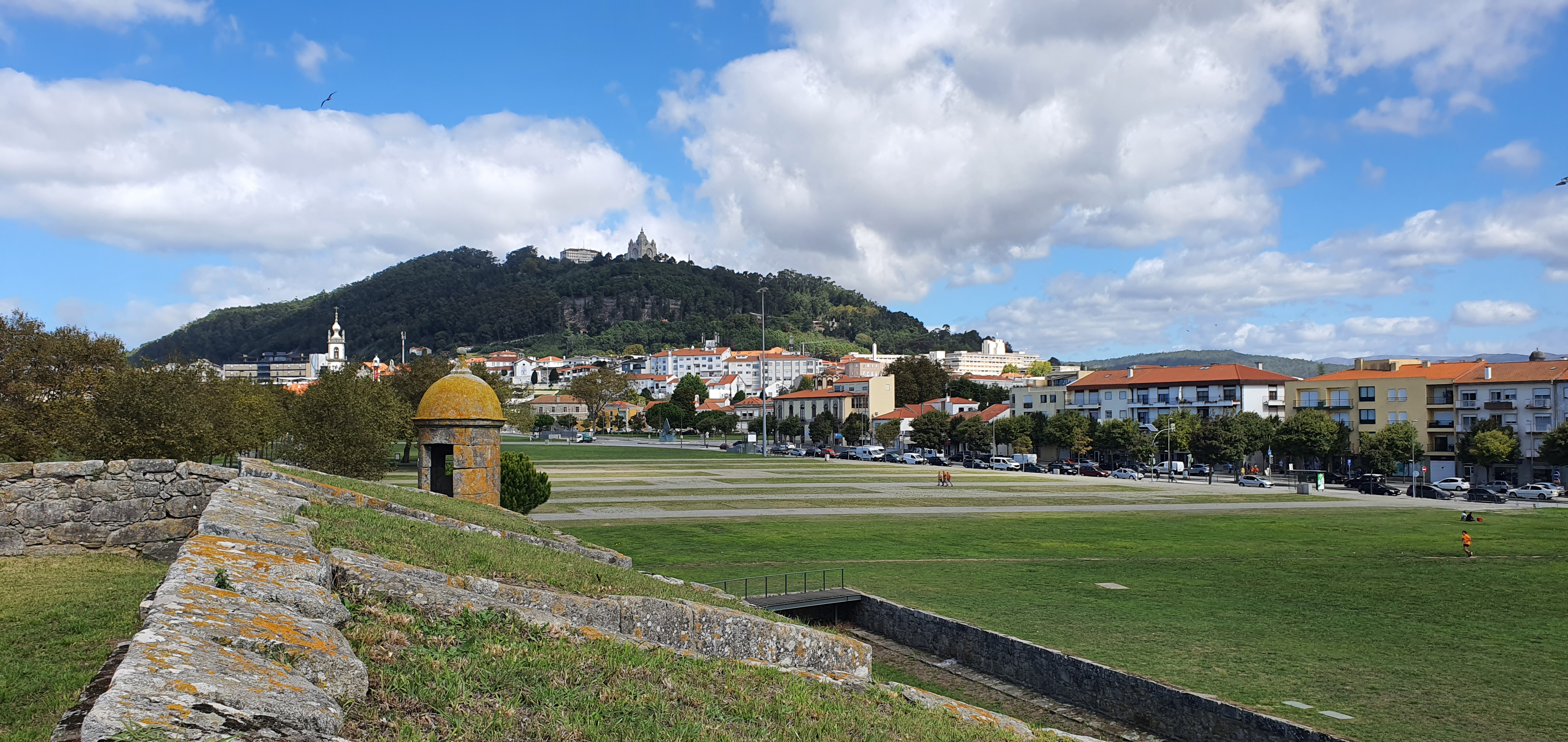
View over the city.

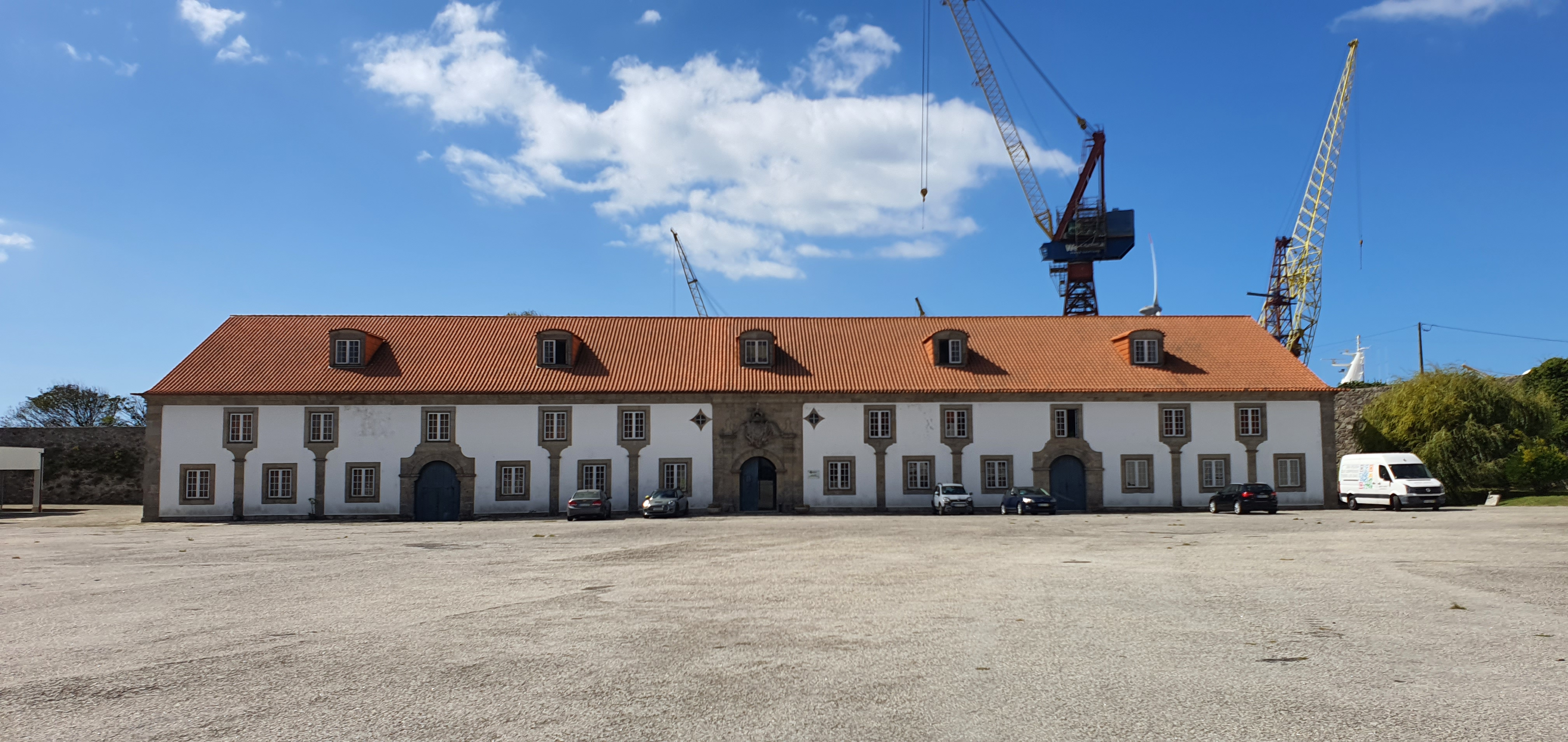
School of Tourism within the fort.

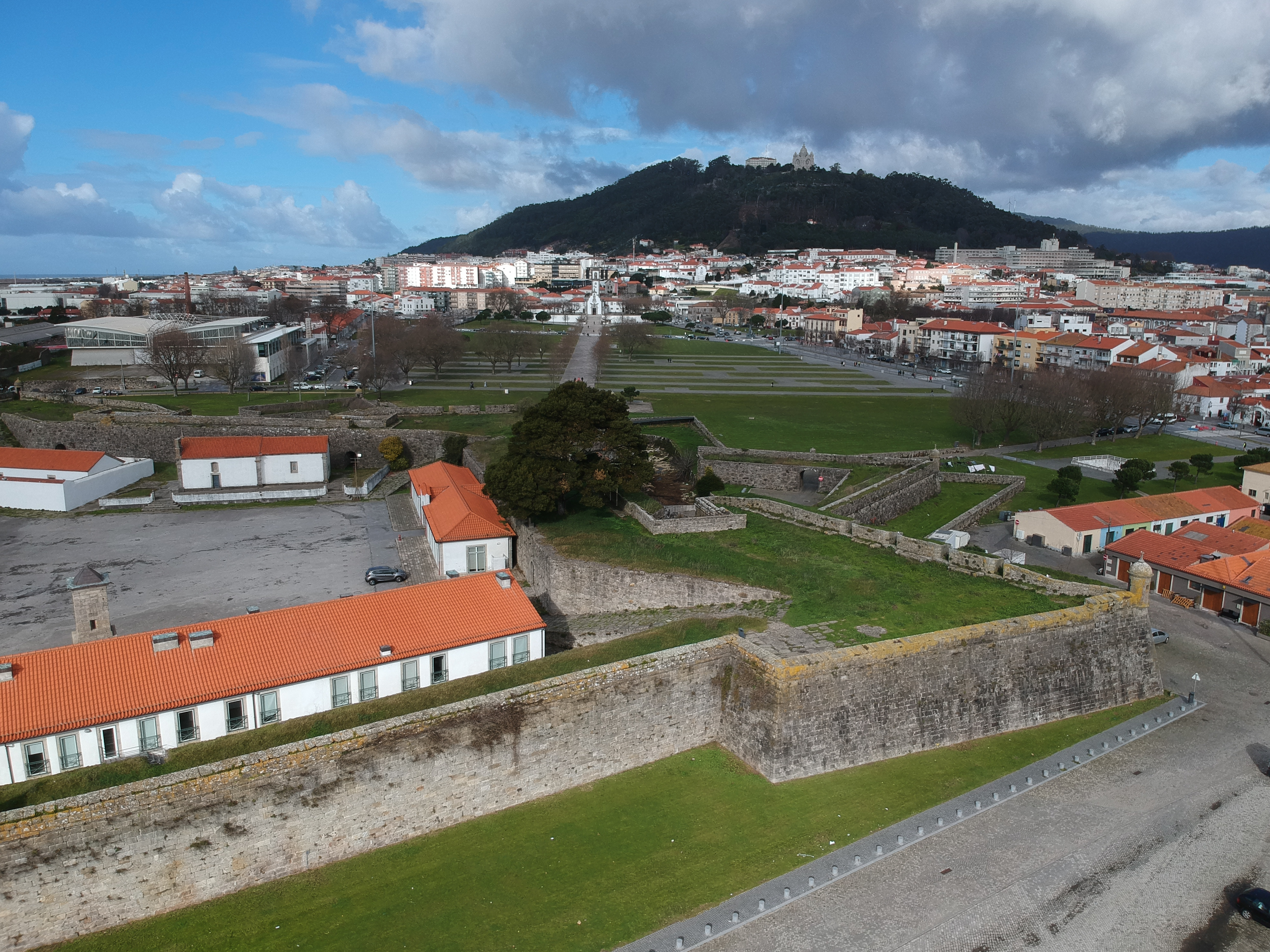
Landside bulwark.

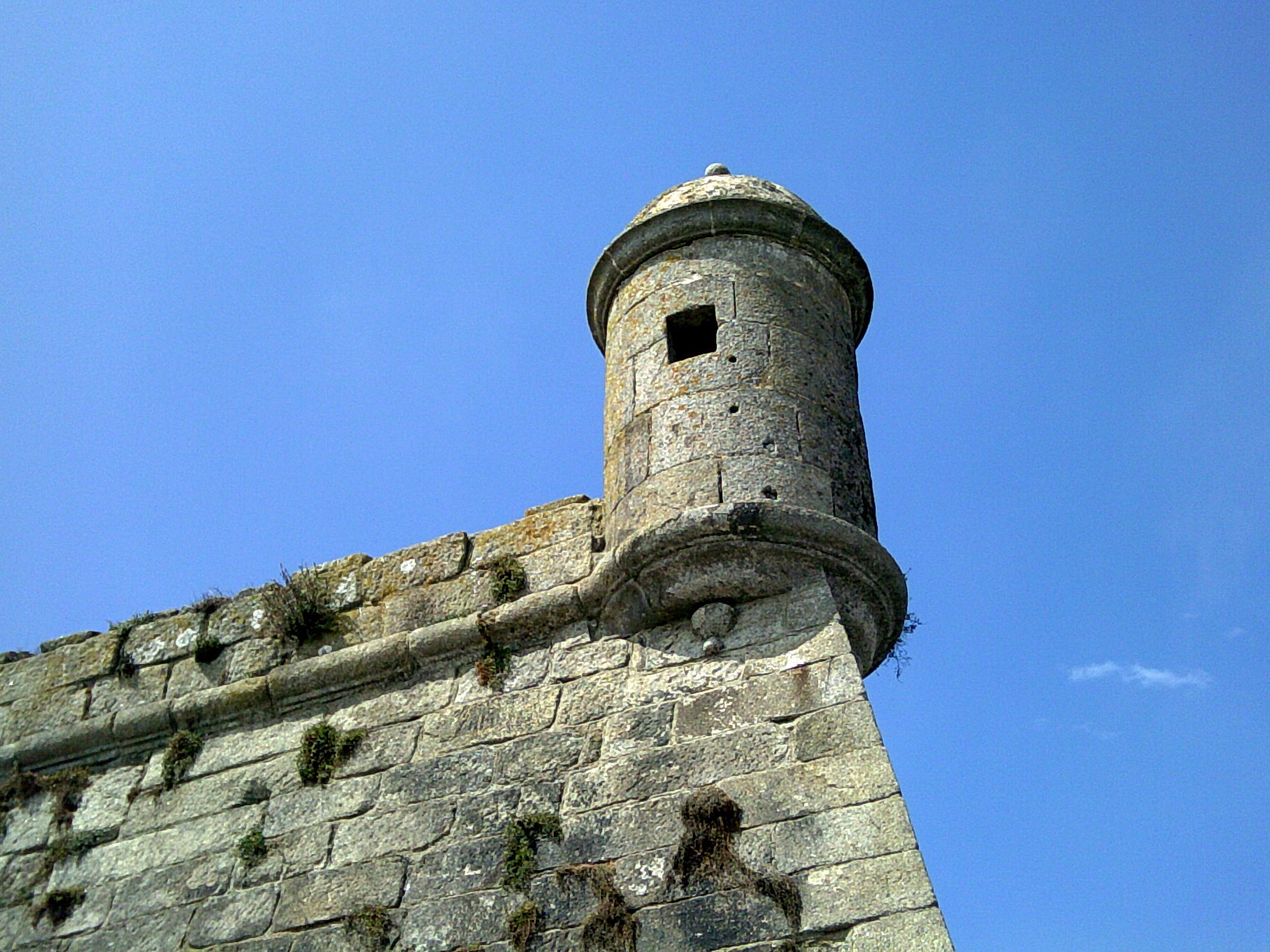
Sentry box.

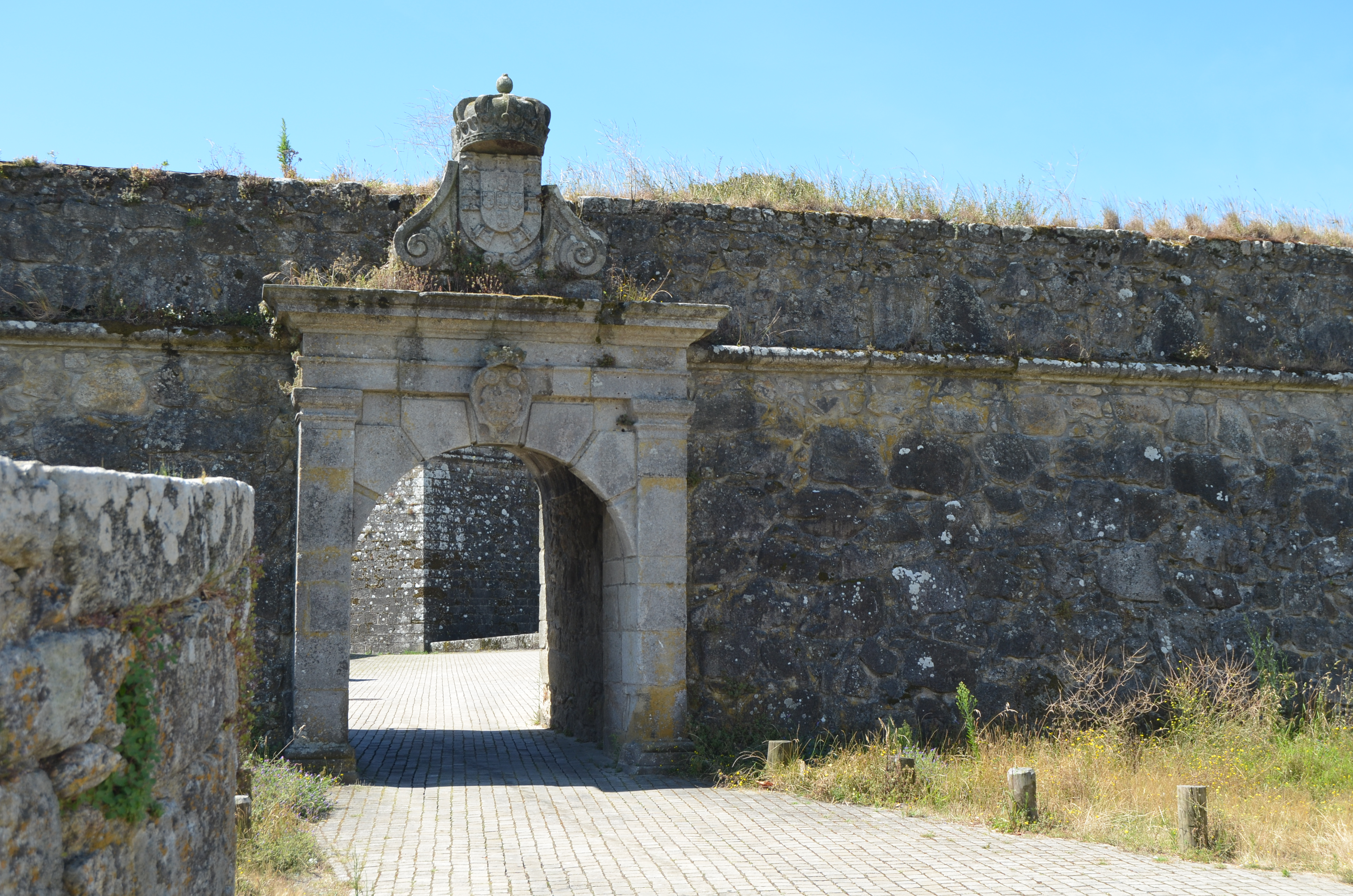
Outer gate.

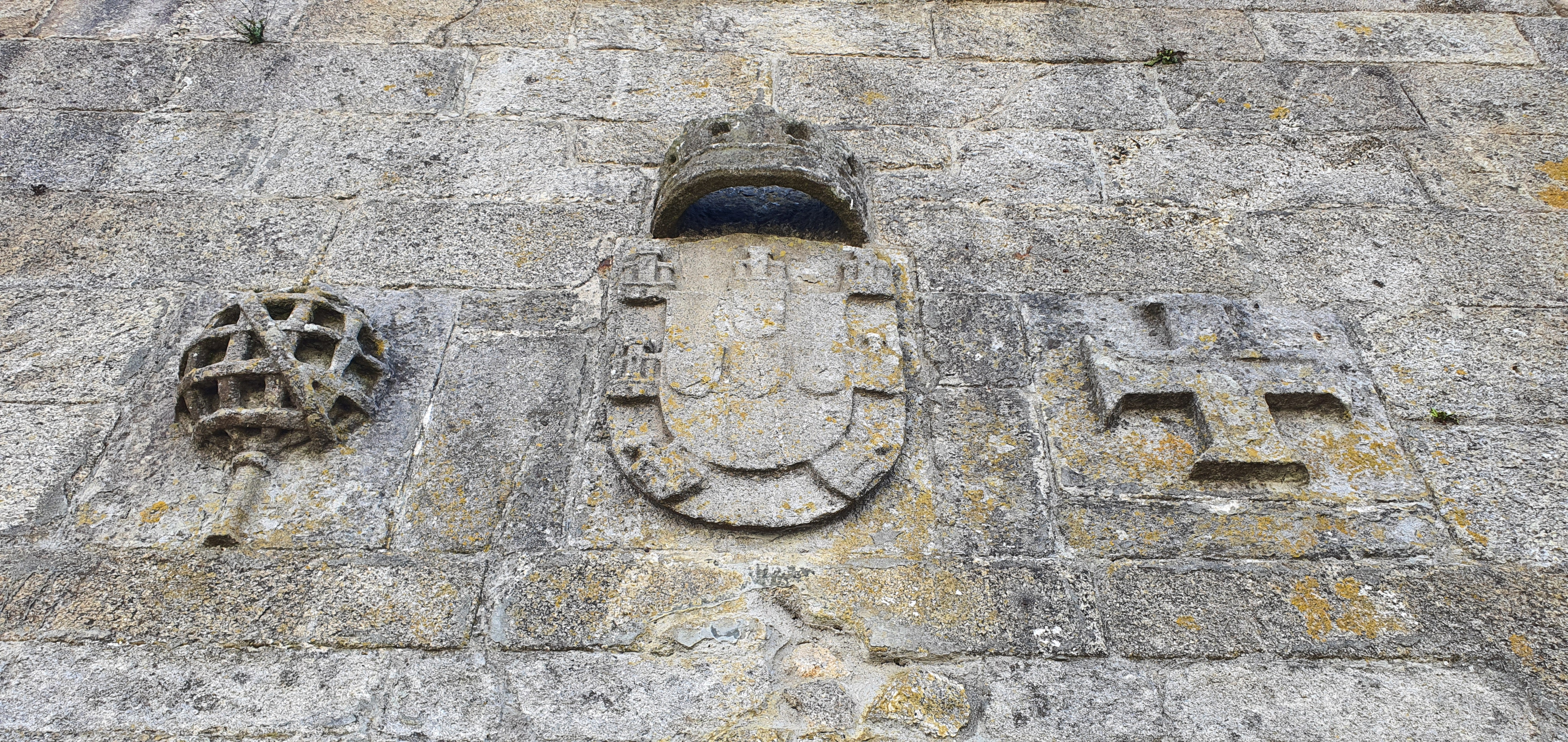
Armillary sphere, royal arms and Cross of the Order of Christ sculpted on the walls.

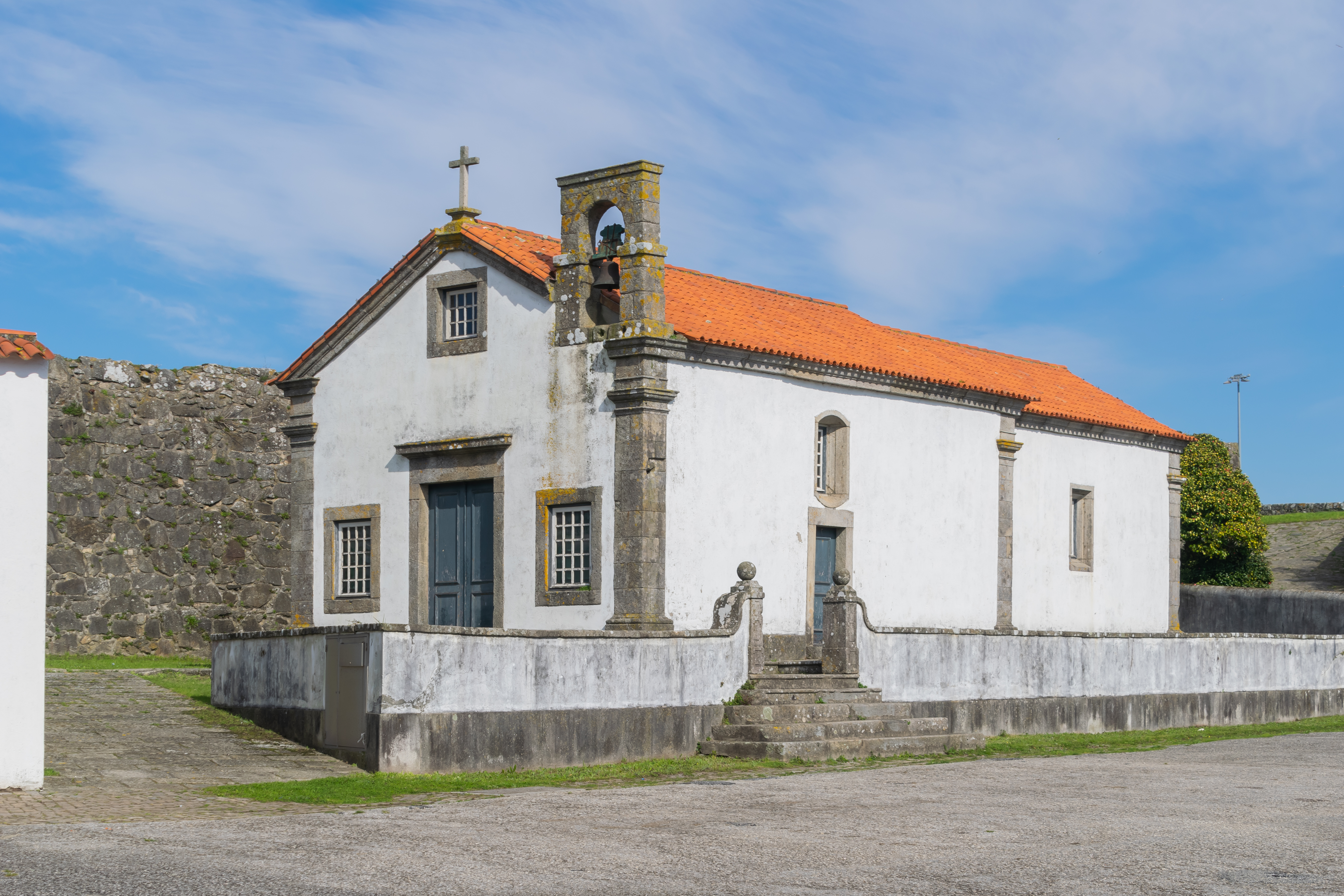
Chapel within the fort.
