= Vila Praia de Âncora =

Portuguese civil parish

- Civil parish
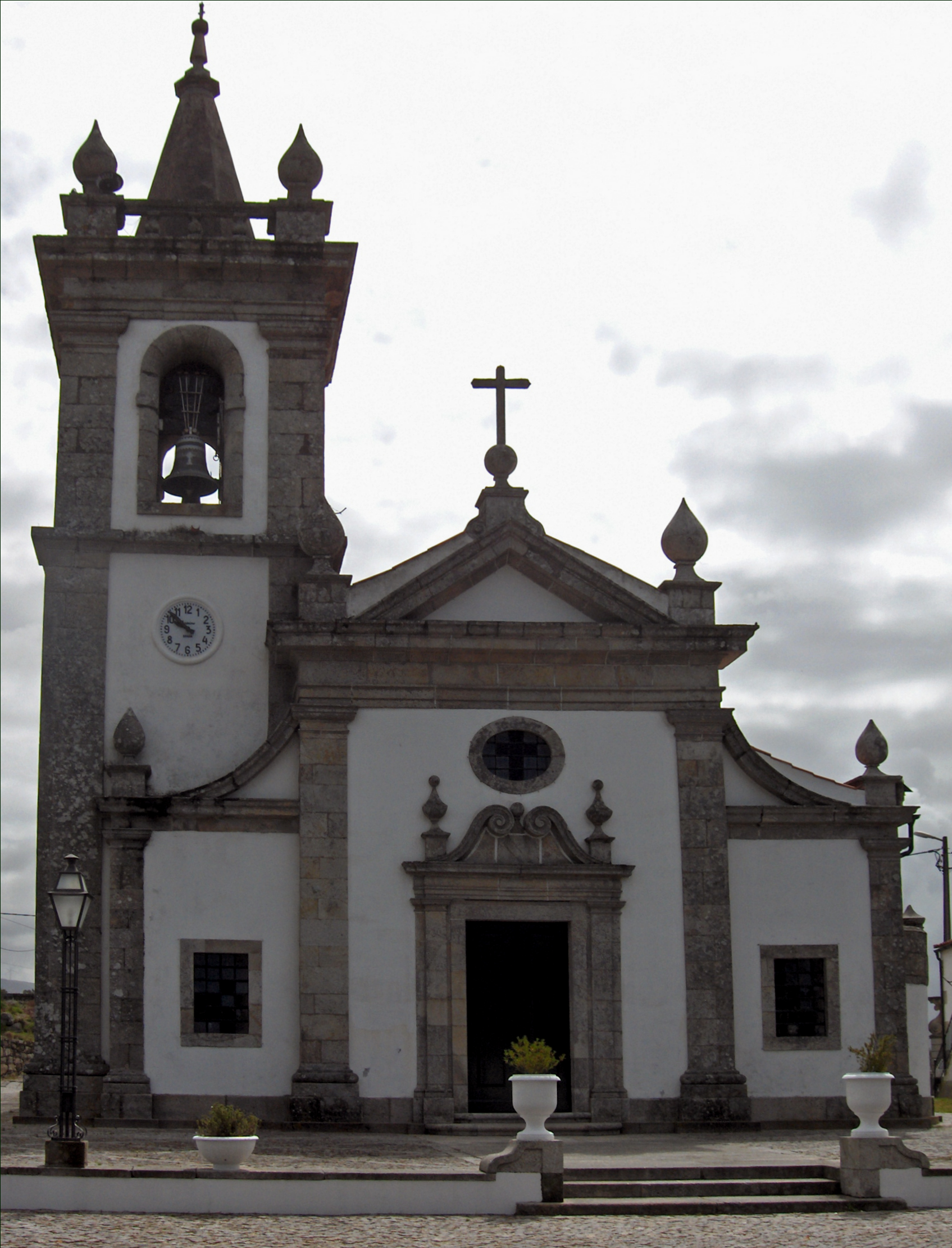

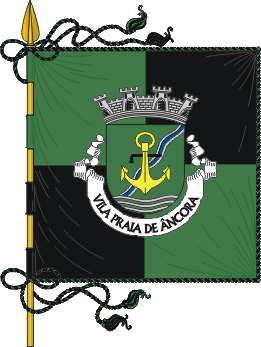
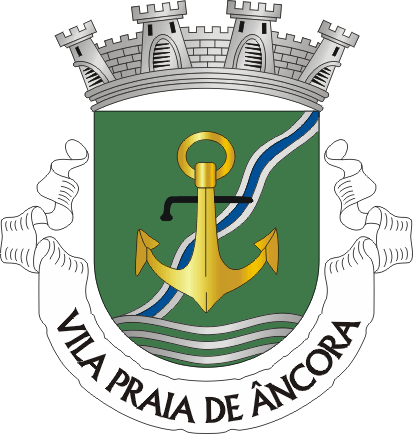
- Flag Coat of arms

- Location in Portugal
- Coordinates: 41°49′01″N 8°51′33″W
- Country: Portugal
- Region: Norte
- Intermunic. comm.: Alto Minho
- District: Viana do Castelo
- Municipality: Caminha

Area
  - Total: 8.37 km^{2} (3.23 sq mi)

Population (2021)
  - Total: 4,623
  - Density: 552/km^{2} (1,430/sq mi)
- Time zone: UTC+00:00 (WET)
  - Summer (DST): UTC+01:00 (WEST)
- Patron: Santa Marinha
- Website: jf-vpancora.com

Vila Praia de Âncora is a town and a civil parish in the municipality of Caminha in Portugal. It covers an area of 8.37 square kilometres (3.23 mi^{2}) and had 4,623 residents as of 2021. Vila Praia de Âncora is the most populous town and parish in Caminha.

The seat of the civil parish was elevated to the category of vila (town) on 5 July 1924, at which time its official name was changed from Santa Marinha de Gontinhães to Vila Praia de Âncora.

== Toponym ==
The original name of the parish, Gontinhães, is believed to derive from the domains of a landowner named Guntinus. Through linguistic evolution, Guntini (genitive of Guntinus) developed into Guntila and later Guntilanis, eventually giving rise to Gontinhães. An alternative explanation links the name to the Latin form Quintilanes, which, through the softening of the initial consonant, became Guintilanes and subsequently Gontinhães.

From the second quarter of the 19th century, the parish began to shift towards the coast, driven by new economic activities related to fishing and seaside tourism. This process encouraged population growth and the spread of the designation Praia d'Âncora (Beach of Anchor), used for the local beach by the Âncora river and for the railway halt in the Minho line, which opened in 1878. By the mid-19th century, regional newspapers already alternated between the names Gontinhães and Praia d'Âncora.

Âncora is the Portuguese word for anchor and this hydronym and toponym is thought to derive from the Indo-European root anc, meaning "he who has power". Variants of this root appear in other place names in Minho and Galicia, such as the Galician settlement of Camposancos, A Guarda.

== Geography ==
Vila Praia de Âncora is located at the end of the valley of the Âncora river, between the foothills of the Arga mountain range and the Calvário mountain. There is a sandy beach by the town, divided in two by the Âncora River. The northern end, closest to the town, is bounded by the breakwater of a small fishing harbor, while the southern end can be accessed by via a pedestrian bridge

== Demography ==
Between the 1864 and 1930 censuses, the parish was recorded under the name Gontinhães. Its present designation, Vila Praia de Âncora, was established by Law No. 1616 of 5 July 1924, which also elevated the parish seat to the status of vila (town). The 1930 census, however, contains a number of discrepancies in the data for several parishes in the municipality of Caminha when compared with the figures from 1920 and 1940. The population figures recorded in the census were as follows:

Population of Vila Praia de Âncora (1864–2021)

Year	Pop.	±%
1864	1,199	—
1878	1,616	+34.8%
1890	1,906	+17.9%
1900	2,113	+10.9%
1911	2,666	+26.2%
1920	2,444	−8.3%
1930	1,000	−59.1%
1940	3,241	+224.1%

Year	Pop.	±%
1950	3,662	+13.0%
1960	3,817	+4.2%
1970	2,995	−21.5%
1981	3,922	+31.0%
1991	4,020	+2.5%
2001	4,688	+16.6%
2011	4,820	+2.8%
2021	4,623	−4.1%

Source: INE

Population by age group
Year	0–14	15–24	25–64	65+
2001	737	698	2,486	767
2011	600	603	2,599	1,018
2021	524	427	2,441	1,231

== Attractions ==
- Anta da Barrosa
- Fort of Lagarteira
- Mother Church of Vila Praia de Âncora (Igreja Matriz de Vila Praia de Âncora)
- Calvário mountain

== Notable people ==
- Quim Barreiros, (born 1947), Pimba singer known for double entendre songs.
- Carlos Pinheiro, (1925 - 2010), auxiliary bishop of Braga.
- Romeu Silva (born 1954), a former footballer with 252 club appearances and 11 caps.
