= Marco Paulo (singer) =

Portuguese singer (1945–2024)

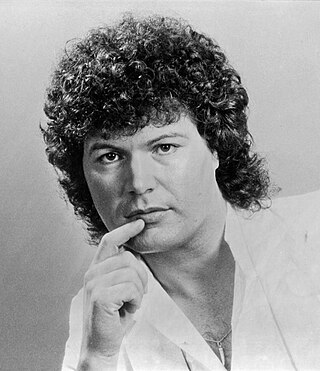
- Marco Paulo
- Born: João Simão da Silva; 21 January 1945; Mourão, Alentejo, Portugal
- Died: 24 October 2024 (aged 79)
- Occupations: Singer; songwriter; musician; television presenter
- Musical career
- Genres: Portuguese Kitsch music; Schlager music; latin ballad; pimba
- Years active: 1966–2024

João Simão da Silva (21 January 1945 – 24 October 2024), known professionally as Marco Paulo, was a Portuguese singer and television presenter. He was one of Portugal's most successful singers and a well-known television host. Many of his greatest hits in Portugal are credited covers of foreign songs that were relatively unknown to the Portuguese audience in their original versions.

== Life and career ==
In 1978, Marco Paulo received the first of many gold discs in his career with the single "Ninguém, Ninguém"/"Canção Proibida."

In 1980, he released one of his biggest hits, "Eu Tenho Dois Amores," which sold over 150,000 copies and achieved triple gold status, a rare feat in Portuguese music at the time. Other hits in the early 1980s included "Mais e mais Amor"/"Quem Vier Por Bem" (1981), "Anita" (1982), "Flor Sem Nome"/"Cá Se Faz, Cá Se Paga" (1983), and "Morena, Morenita" (1984).

In December 1984, Marco Paulo released the album Romance, which featured hits like "Deixa Viver," "Nasci Para Cantar," "Se Deus Quiser," and "Só Falei Para Dizer Que Te Amo," a version of Stevie Wonder's "I Just Called to Say I Love You." This album earned him his first platinum disc. The 1980s also saw success with songs like "Dono Do Meu Coração," "Joana," "Sonho Tropical," "Sempre Que Brilha o Sol," "Anjo Azul," and "Quando o Pai Cantava."

The 1990s began with the release of De Todo o Coração (1990), featuring the singles "Ai Ai Ai Meu Amor" and "Um Amor Em Cada Porto." However, it was the following year, with the song "Taras e Manias," a cover of Brazilian singer Elymar Santos's "Taras e Manias," that Marco Paulo achieved further success, supported by the compilation Maravilhoso Coração.

In 1993, as a reward for his electoral support of Cavaco Silva, Marco Paulo debuted as a TV host on the national television channel RTP1 with the show Eu Tenho Dois Amores, a ratings success for two years. That same year, he released Amor Total, an album that included tracks such as "Enganas-me e Eu Gosto," "Amante, Irmão, Amigo," "Perco a Cabeça," "Meu Querido Rio," and "Coração Deserto."

In 1996, he underwent two operations for cancer, but returned the following year with Reencontro, an album produced by Emanuel, a notable figure in Portuguese Pimba music. Despite ongoing health issues, which continued to affect his life and career, Marco Paulo remained active. By the 2020s, he increasingly focused on hosting television programs.

In 2014, Paulo was awarded the Lifetime Achievement Award at the International Portuguese Music Awards.

Marco Paulo died on 24 October 2024, at the age of 79. The cause of death was cancer of liver and lungs. He had previously survived bouts of testicular and breast cancer.

He left his entire fortune to three very close male friends of his, ostensibly leaving surviving siblings and nephews out of his will.

== Private life ==
His father, a tax inspector, disapproved of Marco Paulo's musical career. He'd rather his son to be an office clerk or a priest than a singer.

Throughout his life, Marco Paulo was never known to have any romantic relationships or a girlfriend, as he refused to discuss his private life. He was a lifelong childless bachelor, very attached to his mother, to a close male associate of his and his son (Paulo's godson), and to a male firefighter he had met in 2019. Marco Paulo was also very devoted to Our Lady of Fátima.

For most of his life, he adopted a tacky style, characterized by a curly perm, sprayed dyed hair, and plucked eyebrows.

== See also ==
- Tony Carreira
