= Rosinha =

Rosinha Rosa Maria Sequeira Inácio
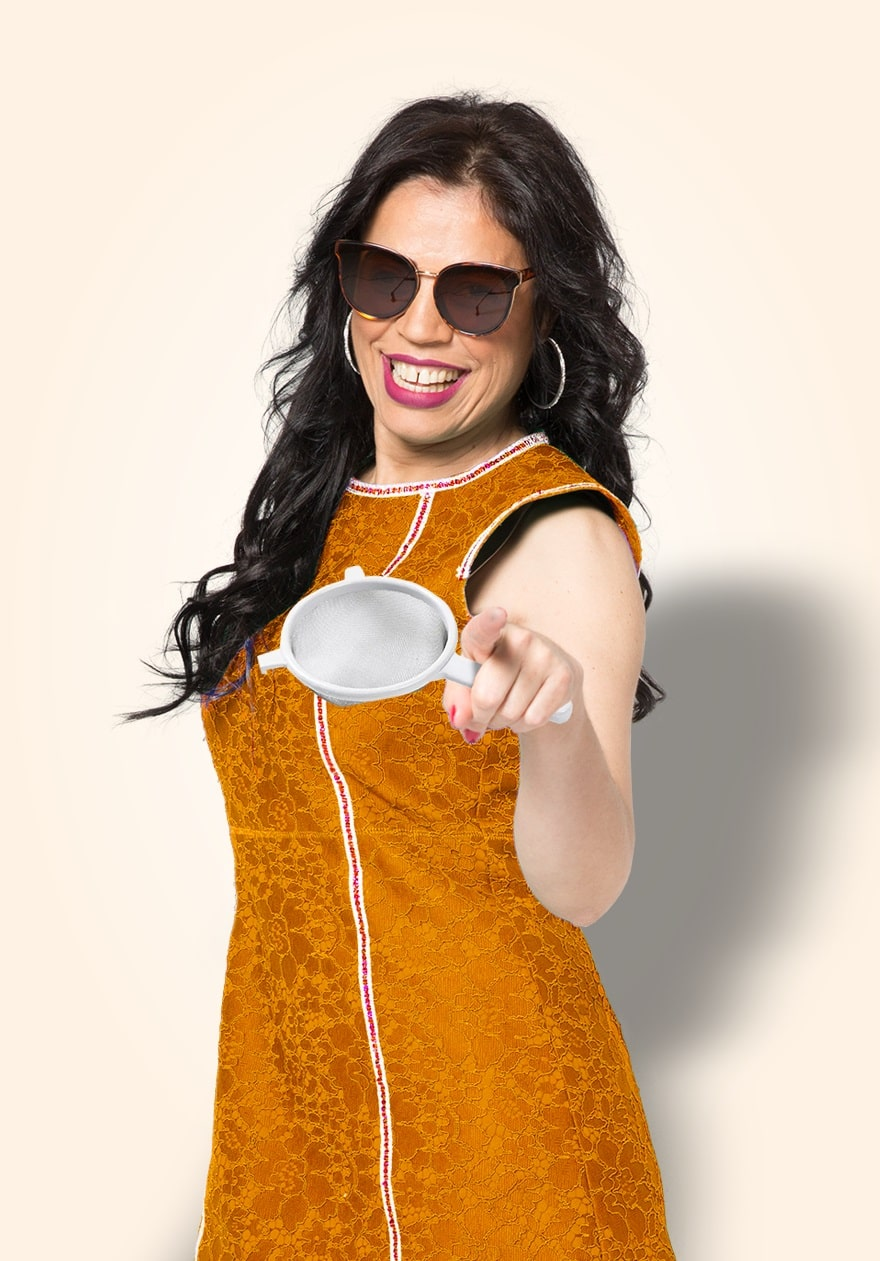
- Rosinha in 2020

Background information
- Born: January 5, 1971; Montijo, Portugal
- Genres: Pimba
- Occupation(s): singer and songwriter
- Instrument: accordion
- Labels: País Real
- Website: rosinha.net

Rosa Maria, known by her stage name, Rosinha, is a Portuguese Pimba singer, songwriter and accordion player.

== Biography ==
Rosa was born in 1971 in Montijo, Portugal and grew up in the parish of Santo Isidro de Pegões, in the exclave of the municipality of Montijo. Her family moved to Montijo when she was 10; it was also at this time when she started playing the accordion. A few years later Rosa started studying at Instituto de Música Vitorino Matono, in Lisbon. She gave her first concerts at 17, as an accordionist. In 2007, producer Páquito Rebelo invited her to record an album. It was at that time that the singer adopted the stage name "Rosinha". Her first concert as Rosinha was in Évora.

== Personal life ==
Rosa has photosensitivity, requiring her to wear sunglasses.

== Discography ==
- Com a Boca no Pipo (2007)
- Só Quer é Fruta (2008)
- Eu Levo no Pacote (2009)
- Eu Chupo (2010)
- Quem põe a minhoca ... (sou eu) (2011)
- Tenho Um Andar Novo (2012)
- Na Minha Panela Não Entra (2013)
- Eu Seguro no Pincel (2014)
- Eu Lavo a Ameijôa (2015)
- Eu Faço De Coentrada (2016)
- É de Gatas Que Eu Gosto (2017)
- Eu Descasco-lhe a Banana (2018)
- Eu Mexo Nos Telhões do Meu Amor (2019)
- Fica Sempre no Coador (2020)
- Eu Tenho Uma Cana Boa (2021)
- Eu Agarro-lhe no Barrote (2022)
- Com Sola A Frente, Com Sola Atrás (2023)
- Adoro... É Pequenino Mas É Trabalhador (2024)
