= Areosa =

- Civil parish
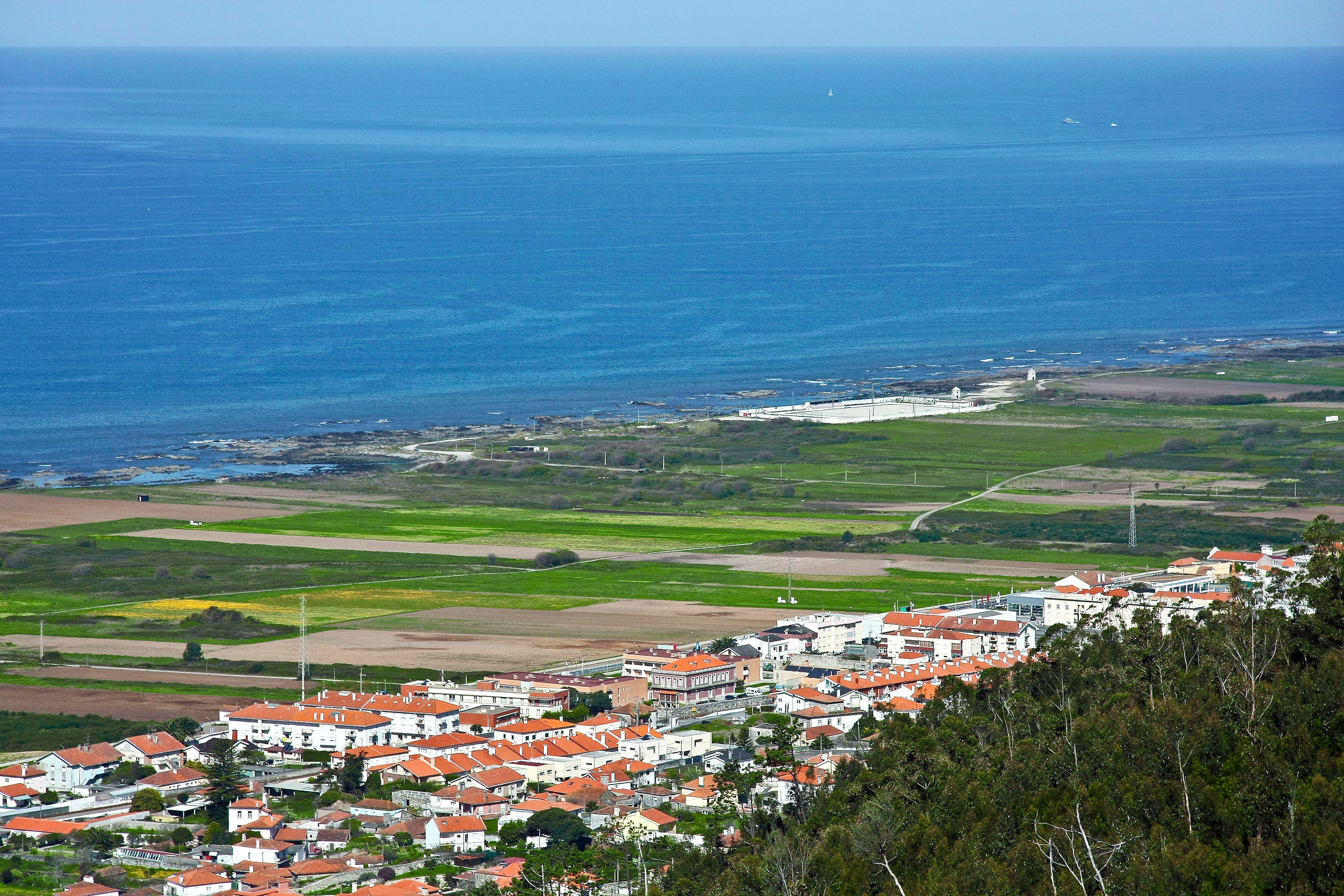
- Areosa (2013)

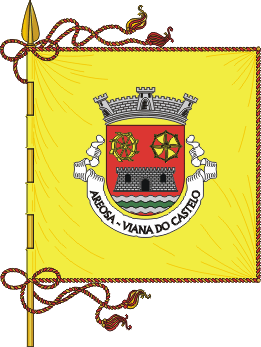
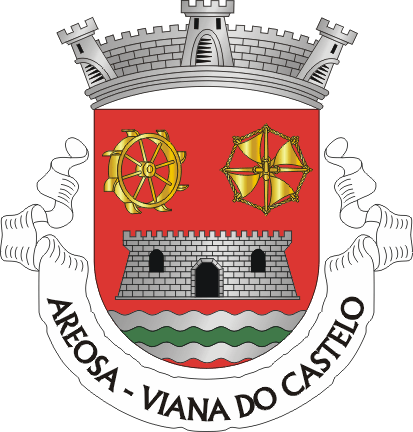
- Flag Coat of arms

- Location in Portugal
- Coordinates: 41.719°N 8.853°W
- Country: Portugal
- Region: Norte
- Intermunic. comm.: Alto Minho
- District: Viana do Castelo
- Municipality: Viana do Castelo

Area
  - Total: 14.11 km^{2} (5.45 sq mi)

Population (2011)
  - Total: 4,853
  - Density: 343.9/km^{2} (890.8/sq mi)
- Time zone: UTC+00:00 (WET)
  - Summer (DST): UTC+01:00 (WEST)
- Postal code: 4900
- Area code: 258
- Patron: Nossa Senhora da Vinha

Areosa is a civil parish located in the municipality (concelho) of Viana do Castelo, in northern Portugal. The population in 2011 was 4,853, in an area of 14.11 km^{2}.

== Demographics ==
The population of the civil parish of Areosa recorded in the national censuses was as follows:

Population of Areosa
Year	Pop.	±%
1864	1,599	—
1878	1,644	▲2.8%
1890	1,821	▲10.8%
1900	1,814	▼0.4%
1911	1,966	▲8.4%
1920	1,877	▼4.5%
1930	1,830	▼2.5%
1940	2,208	▲20.7%
1950	2,778	▲25.8%
1960	3,695	▲33.0%
1970	3,457	▼6.4%
1981	3,968	▲14.8%
1991	4,065	▲2.4%
2001	4,485	▲10.3%
2011	4,853	▲8.2%
2021	4,698	▼3.2%
