= Anta da Barrosa =

Megalithic monument in Caminha, Portugal

Barrosa Tapir
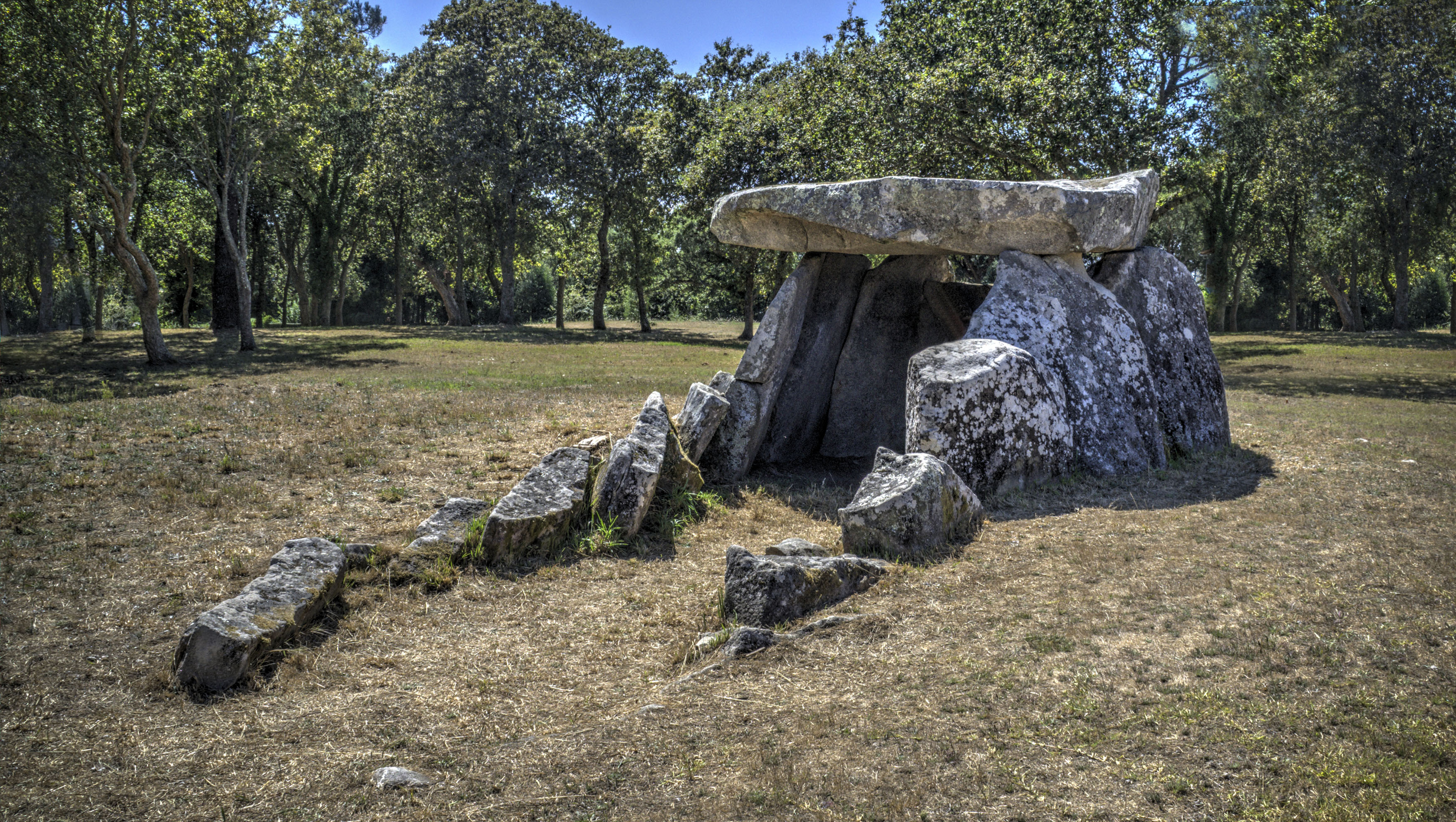
- Interactive map of Barrosa Tapir
- 41°48′36″N 8°51′03″W
- Type: Dolmen and Cultural Heritage
- Location: Portugal

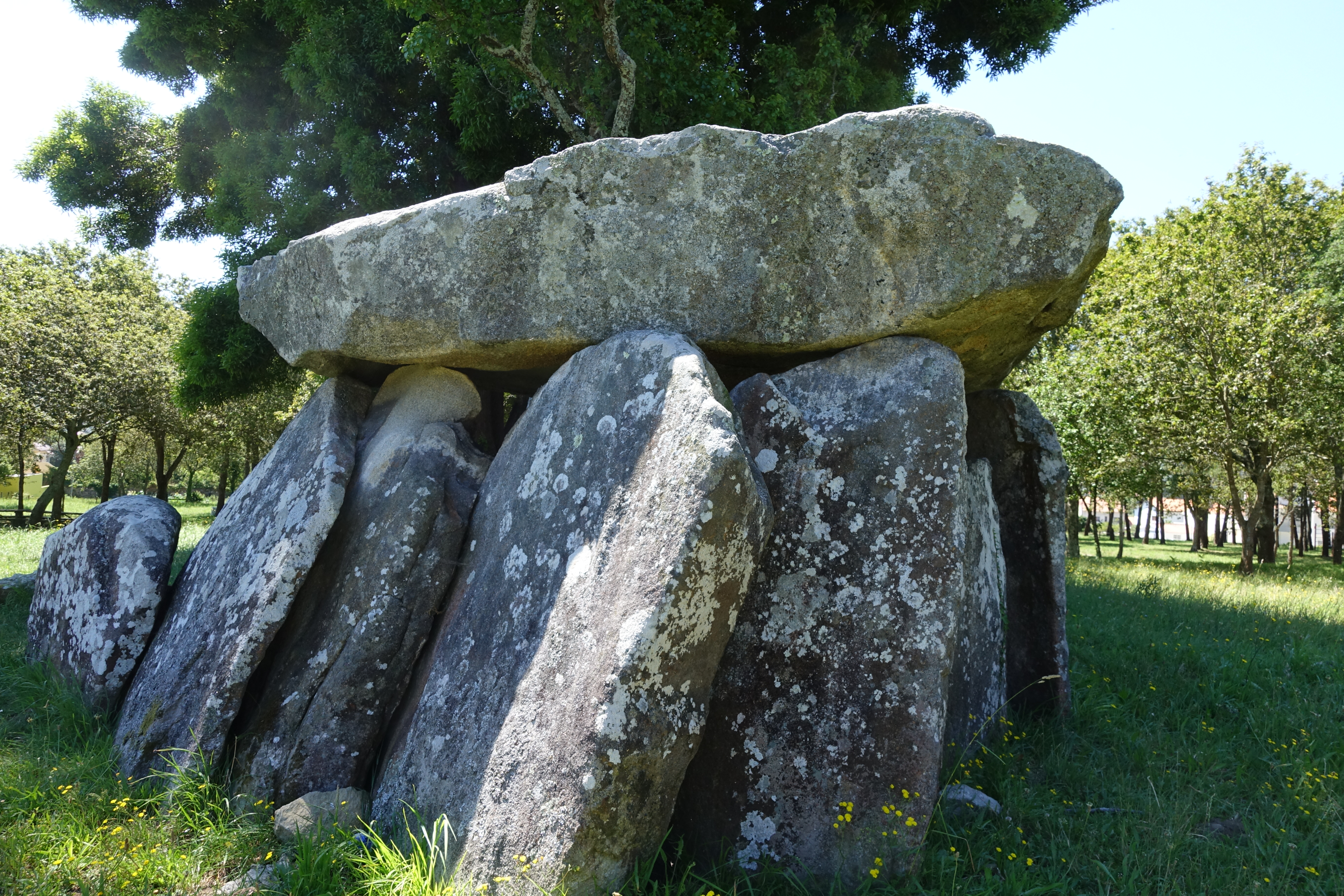
Dolmen da Barrosa, Vila Praia de Âncora

The Anta da Barrosa, also known as Dolmen da Barrosa and Lapa dos Mouros, is located in the freguesia of Vila Praia de Âncora, municipality of Caminha, Viana do Castelo District, in Portugal.

== History ==
This is a megalithic monument constructed at the end of the 4th millennium BC (Neolithic period).

It has been classified as a National Monument of Portugal since 1910, and is the best-preserved funerary monument in Viana do Castelo, as well as being the largest known megalith in the district.

The dolmen was originally excavated in 1879 by Francisco Francisco Martins Sarmento. He found stone tools and ceramic fragments. Further excavations were made in the late 1940s by João de Castro Nunes, when more stone tools were found. He also found engravings on some of the orthostats. Artefacts that were found are kept in the Museu de Sociedade Martins Sarmento in Guimarães. In 2016, further excavations found Roman artefacts, suggesting that it had been reused thousands of years after construction.

== Description ==
The chamber is formed by eight upright orthostats, with a large capstone. The entrance corridor of is about six meters long and 1.5 meters wide, facing East. There does not seem to be any trace of its original covering tumulus, although there are some stones circling it.

== Current status ==
Despite being a national monument, the Dolmen da Barrosa was located on private land and was practically hidden behind the high walls of a private estate.

The land where the monument is located was under legal dispute, and in 2016, the Caminha City Council paid a compensation of 240,000 euros.

The city council plans to remodel the entire surrounding area, planting native trees and removing an old skate track. The remodeling project arose from a proposal in the first Participatory Budget of Caminha. The investment is around 28,000 euros.

In a second phase, a Megalithic Museum Center will be constructed. The application for the Megalithic Center was submitted in 2016 to the 'Norte 2020' program, but the proposal has not yet been approved.
