= International Portuguese Music Awards =

Annual awards show

The International Portuguese Music Awards (commonly abbreviated as IPMA) is an annual music awards show that recognizes songs and music videos recorded and produced by artists of Portuguese descent residing in any country.

== Ceremony locations ==
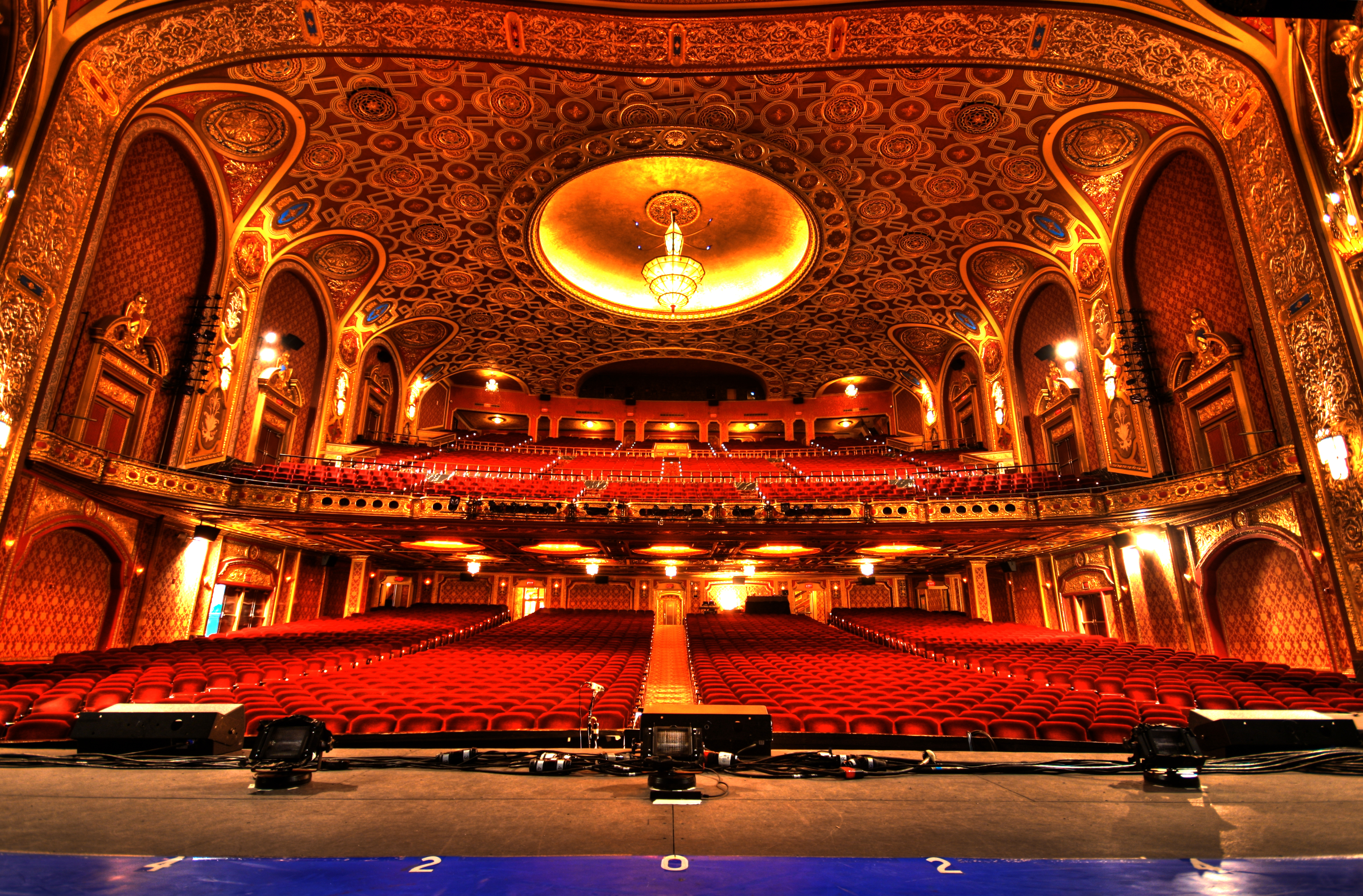
The International Portuguese Music Awards (IPMA) are held at the Providence Performing Arts Center (PPAC).

From the first edition in 2013 until 2019, the event was held at the Zeiterion Performing Arts Center in New Bedford, Massachusetts. Due to the COVID-19 pandemic IPMA was held virtually from 2020 to 2021. When the in-person awards show returned in 2022, it found a new location at the Providence Performing Arts Center in Providence, Rhode Island.

Rhode Island, like Massachusetts, has a significant population of individuals from Portugal or of Portuguese descent. Portuguese is the third-most spoken language in Rhode Island.

== Nomination and awarding process ==
Artists or their representatives submit their entries online via IPMA's official website. A confidential panel of judges located in different countries review and score the submissions. For the "New Talent" category, two finalists compete live at the show in front of a panel of judges so the winner can be selected based on their live performance.

The only category voted on by the public is the "IPMA People's Choice Award".

== Categories ==
Active

- Dance
- Fado
- Instrumental
- Music Video of the Year
- Música Popular
- New Talent
- People’s Choice
- Pop
- Rap/Hip-Hop
- Rock
- Song of the Year
- Traditional
- World Music

== Lifetime Achievement Award ==
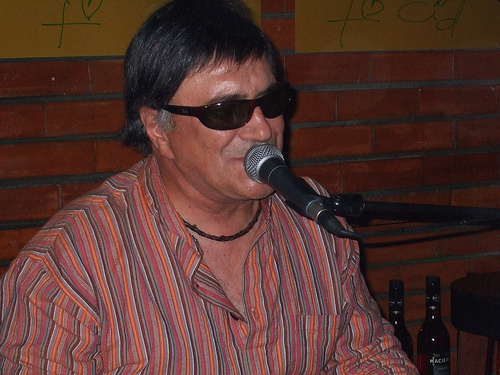
José Cid was the recipient of the IPMA Lifetime Achievement Award in 2023.

Some editions of the International Portuguese Music Awards also awarded the "IPMA Lifetime Achievement Award".

- Roberto Leal (2013)
- Marco Paulo (2014)
- Pedro Abrunhosa (2015)
- Paulo Gonzo (2016)
- Daniela Mercury (2017)
- Xutos & Pontapés (2018)
- Jorge Ferreira (2022)
- José Cid (2023)
