= Quim Barreiros =

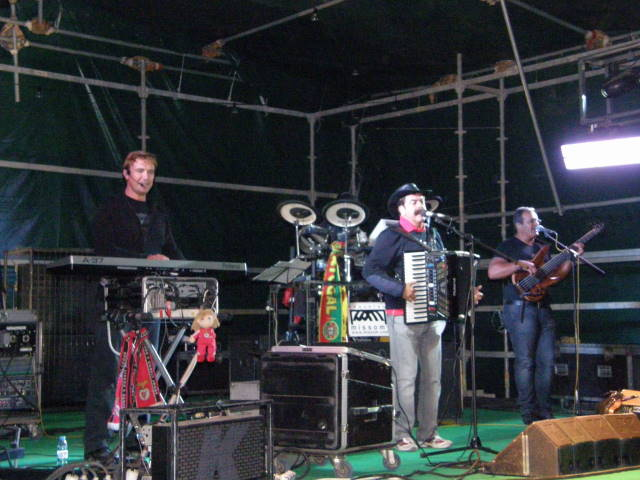

Background information
- Born: June 19, 1947 (age 78); Vila Praia de Âncora, Caminha, Portugal
- Genres: Pimba, folklore
- Occupations: Music writer, singer
- Years active: 1971–present
- Website: www.quimbarreiros.pt

Joaquim de Magalhães Fernandes Barreiros (born June 19, 1947, in Vila Praia de Âncora, Portugal), known professionally as Quim Barreiros, is a Portuguese Pimba music writer, singer and accordion player, more known for his double entendre songs. Among his biggest hits are Bacalhau à Portuguesa [Portuguese Style Cod] (1986), A Garagem da Vizinha [The Neighbour's Garage] (2000) and A Cabritinha [The Little Goat] (2004).

He started his career before Emanuel, being one of the first, if not the actual first, documented case of pimba.

== Biography ==
Quim Barreiros was born on June 19, 1947, in Vila Praia de Âncora, municipality of Caminha, Viana do Castelo District, to a Portuguese mother and a Portuguese father who was born in Brazil.

When he was 9 years old, he started playing the drums in his father's band (Conjunto Alegria), after some years he started playing the accordion along with his father, until he joined a folklore group called Sta. Marta de Portuzelo and started touring around Portugal and some nearby countries like Spain and France, which allowed Quim to meet lots of folklore artists from different regions and with different styles.

When he was 20 years old, he had to undergo mandatory military service in Lisbon, and then joined the Portuguese Air Force, as well as the Air Force's band. His involvement with the Air Force band also meant that Quim wouldn't get sent to the wars on the Portuguese colonies.

In the day Quim dealt with his military duties, at night he started attending Casas de Fado (Houses of Fado), places where you can have a meal while listening to Fado classics, and eventually started having concerts in these houses. Quim's music contrasted with the serenity and sternness of Fado, but was well received.

In 1971, Quim releases his first LP Quim Barreiros – Acordeão, then in 1974 he released his second LP Quim Barreiros – Povo Que Canta. These were composed mostly of Portuguese folklore classics. After these, Quim started writing his own songs and developing his spicy, double meaning lyricism.

Quim then toured several countries that have Portuguese emigrant communities such as the United States, Canada, France, Germany and more.

In the meantime he continued releasing some albums and compilations full of funny scenarios and double meaning, eventually becoming one of the most loved Portuguese musicians at the time.

His music reached both the old and the young demographic, and in the middle of the 80's, he started performing at student association parties such as Queima das Fitas, Academic Week and freshman receptions, a tradition maintained alive to this day.

== Discography ==
- 1971 - Quim Barreiros Acordeão
- 1973 - Recebi um Convite
- 1975 - O Malhão Não É Reaccionário
- 1981 - Dance Com Quim Barreiros e o Super-Trio
- 1986 - Bacalhau à Portuguesa
- 1986 - Riacho da Pedreira
- 1991 - CD D'Ouro
- 1992 - O Sorveteiro (Chupa Teresa)
- 1992 - Original (O Franguito da Maria)
- 1993 - Insónia
- 1993 - Deixa Botar Só a Cabeça (Acredita em Mim)
- 1994 - Meu Dinossauro
- 1994 - Mestre da Culinária
- 1994 - Os 60 Maiores Êxitos
- 1995 - Nunca Gastes Tudo
- 1996 - Minha Vaca Louca/Melhor Dia Para Casar
- 1997 - 15 Grandes Sucessos
- 1998 - Marcha da Expo'98 (A Última do Milénio)
- 1998 - Na Internet
- 1998 - O Melhor dos Melhores
- 1999 - Marcha do 3º Milénio
- 2000 - A Garagem da Vizinha
- 2001 - Comer, Comer
- 2002 - Depois da Uma
- 2002 - Cantares ao Desafio
- 2003 - O Melhor de Quim Barreiros
- 2003 - Na Tua Casa Tá Entrando Outro Macho
- 2004 - A Cabritinha
- 2004 - O Melhor de Quim Barreiros, Vol. 2
- 2005 - Riacho da Pedreira
- 2005 - O Ténis
- 2006 - DVD – Quim Barreiros Live
- 2006 - A Padaria
- 2007 - Use Álcool
- 2008 - Fui Acudir
- 2008 - O Melhor de Quim Barreiros, Vol. 3
- 2009 - O Peixe
- 2010 - Deixai-me Chutar
- 2011 - O Brioche da Sofia
- 2012 - Dar ao Apito
- 2013 - Mole Não Entra
- 2014 - Caça-Asneiras
- 2015 - O Pau Caiu na Panela
- 2016 - Eu Faço 69
- 2017 - O Zinho
- 2018 - O Meu Refogado
- 2019 - Amélia Costureira
- 2020 - Será Porca ou Parafuso?
