= Roberto Leal (singer) =

Portuguese singer and songwriter (1951–2019)

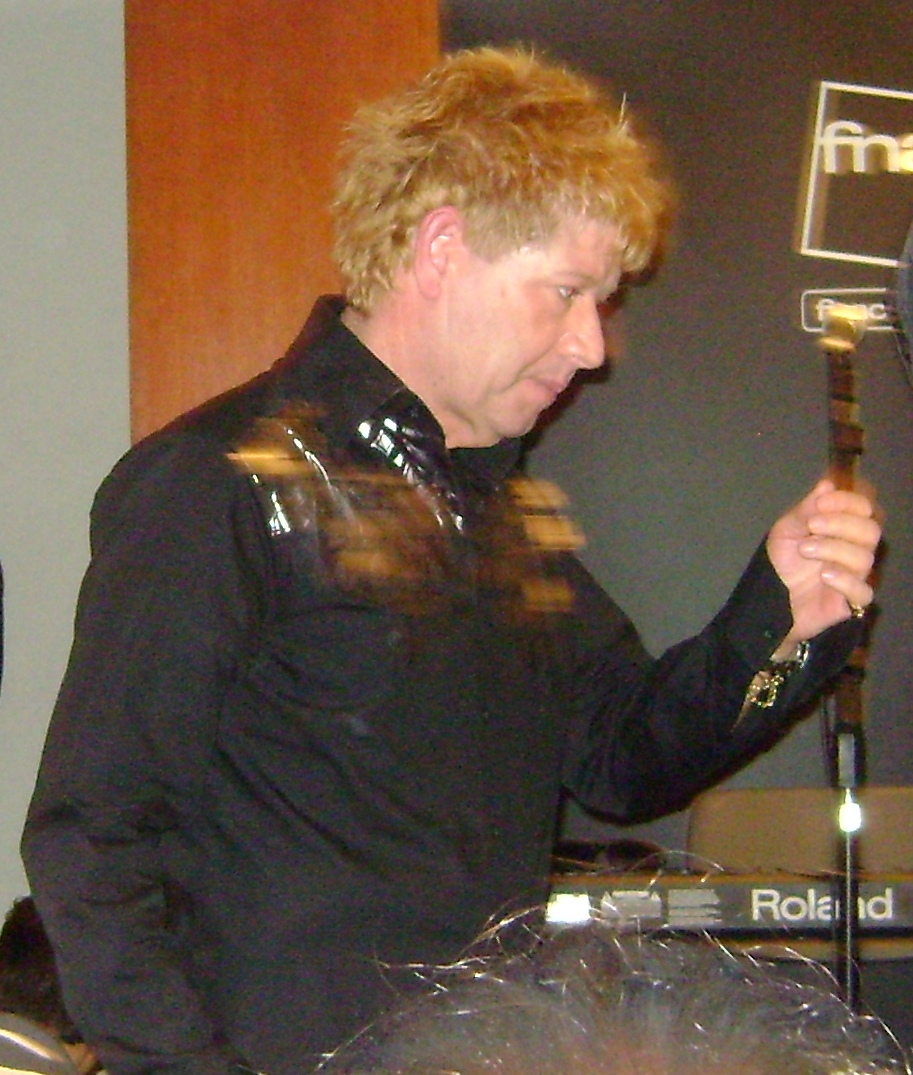
- Born: António Joaquim Fernandes; 27 November 1951; Macedo de Cavaleiros, Portugal
- Died: 15 September 2019 (aged 67); São Paulo, Brazil
- Occupations: singer; songwriter
- Years active: 1971–2019
- Children: 3
- Musical career
- Instrument: Vocals
- Label: EMI
- Website: robertoleal.com

António Joaquim Fernandes (27 November 1951 – 15 September 2019), known as Roberto Leal, was a Portuguese singer and songwriter. He sold more than 25 million albums, and received 30 golden records and 5 platinum records.

== Biography ==
Leal was born in Macedo de Cavaleiros municipality, Bragança District, in northeast Portugal. In 1962 his family moved to Brazil.

Roberto Leal wrote and produced most of his songs. Some of Leal's best known songs are: Bate o Pé, Clareou, O Vinho de Meu Amor, and Marrabenta. In 2007 and 2010 he released albums in both Portuguese and Mirandese. Leal had a dynamic vocal range and was a great dancer.

In 2013, Leal performed at the first annual International Portuguese Music Awards where he was also presented with the IPMA Lifetime Achievement Award.

Leal had a wife Márcia Lúcia and three children.

== Illness and death ==
In January 2019, Leal stated he had been fighting cancer for the past two years and had lost part of his sight due to two cataracts.

Roberto Leal died at age 67 on 15 September 2019 of kidney failure, following complications from an allergic reaction during his fight against cancer. He had been in hospital for five days in the semi-intensive unit of the Samaritano Hospital de São Paulo.

== Discography ==
- 1973 – Arrebita
- 1974 – Lisboa Antiga
- 1975 – Minha Gente
- 1976 – Carimbó Português
- 1977 – Rock Vira
- 1978 – Terra da Maria
- 1979 – Senhora da Serra
- 1980 – Obrigado Brasil
- 1981 – A Banda Chegou
- 1982 – Foi Preciso Navegar
- 1983 – Férias em Portugal
- 1984 – Baile dos Passarinhos
- 1985 – Um Grande Amor
- 1986 – Dá cá um Beijo
- 1987 – Como é Linda Minha Aldeia
- 1988 – A Fada dos Meus Fados
- 1989 – Em Algum Lugar
- 1990 – Quem Somos Nós
- 1991 – Gosto de Sal
- 1992 – Rumo ao Futuro
- 1992 – Romantismo de Portugal
- 1993 – Raça Humana
- 1994 – Vozes de Um Povo
- 1995 – Festa da Gente
- 1995 – Canções da minha Vida
- 1996 – O Poder da Fé, o Milagre de Sto. Ambrósio
- 1996 – Alma Minha
- 1996 – Refazendo História
- 1997 – Português Brasileiro
- 1998 – Forrandovira
- 1999 – Roberto Canta Roberto
- 2000 – O Melhor de...
- 2001 – Vira Brasil
- 2002 – Reencontro
- 2003 – Folclore I
- 2003 – Folclore II
- 2003 – Sucessos de Verão
- 2003 – Marchas Populares
- 2003 – Místico
- 2003 – Fadista
- 2003 – Canto a Portugal
- 2003 – Romântico
- 2003 – Brasileiro
- 2004 – De Jorge Amado a Pessoa
- 2005 – Alma Lusa
- 2006 – Sucessos da Minha Vida
- 2007 – Canto da Terra
- 2009 – Raiç/Raízes
- 2010 – Vamos Brindar!
- 2014 – Obrigado Brasil!
- 2016 – Arrebenta a Festa

== See also ==
- List of best-selling Latin music artists
