= Carlos Francisco Martins Pinheiro =

Carlos Francisco Martins Pinheiro (May 30, 1925 – June 4, 2010) was the Catholic titular bishop of Dumium and the auxiliary bishop of the Archdiocese of Braga, Portugal. He was born in Vila Praia de Âncora.

Ordained to the priesthood on July 8, 1951, Pinheiro was named auxiliary bishop of the Braga Archdiocese on February 16, 1985 and was ordained bishop on April 28, 1985 retiring on November 10, 2000.
