= Fort of Lagarteira =

- Forte da Lagarteira
- Viana do Castelo, Alto Minho, Norte in Portugal
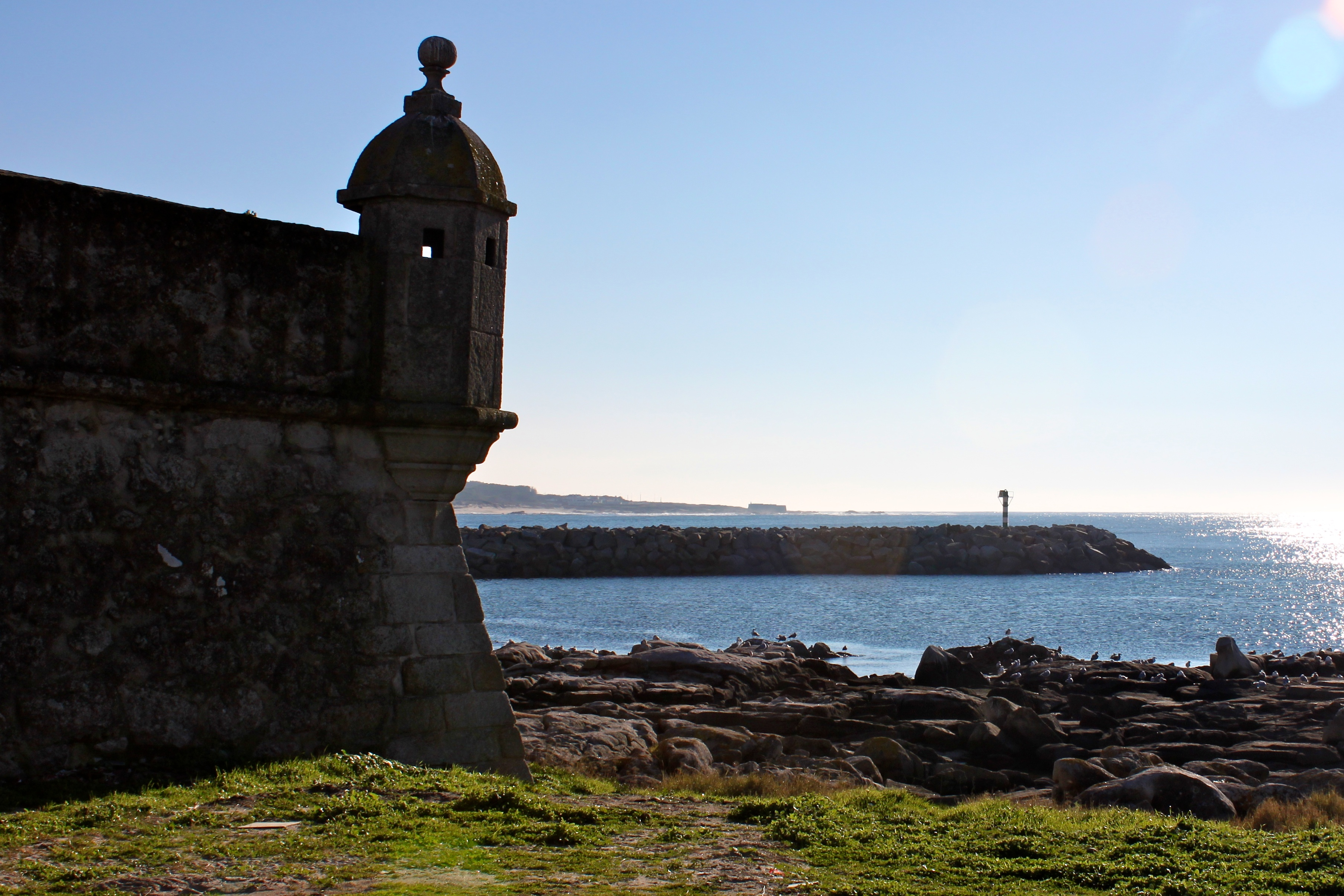
- One of the barbicans overlooking the coast

Site information
- Type: Fort
- Owner: Portuguese Republic
- Operator: Private
- Open to the public: Public

Location
- Coordinates: 41°48′55.9″N 8°52′4.5″W

Site history
- Built: 17th century
- Materials: Granite

The Fort of Lagarteira (Portuguese: Forte de Âncora/Forte da Lagarteira) is a medieval fort in the civil parish of Vila Praia de Âncora, municipality of Caminha in the Portuguese Norte, classified as a Property of Public Interest (Imóvel de Interesse Público).

== History ==
The fort was probably constructed between 1640 and 1668, during the Restoration Wars to protect the Portuguese coast from Spanish attacks. Its structure followed the models established in the era for the construction of fortresses implanted along the Alto Minho area, which was an advance in military defensive fortifications. Engineer Bastos Moreira cites 1690 as the date of its construction, under orders of King D. Pedro II.

On 16 November 1939, the fort was ceded to the Ministério da Marinha (Ministry of the Navy).

Work on the fort by the Direcção dos Serviços de Construção e Conservação (Directorate for Construction and Conservation Services) began in 1955.

On 24 January 1967, by decree the fort was mis-classified as structure in the municipality of Viana do Castelo. Then, on 10 March, the diploma was rectified to correct its effective administrative territory in the municipality of Caminha (47 508; DG, Série I, 59).

Work to improve the stability and consolidate the structure was carried-out in the early 1980s, while the spaces were electrified after 1997 to provide illumination to the site.

== Architecture ==
The fort is located on the right margin of the River Âncora, over a soft cliffside, alongside the port, in an area known as Lagarteira.

Its plan consists of four lateral bastions and accentuated battery, with three of the sides crowned by roof. The walls are grounded in the rocky coast, with its extension circled by a curved frame anc crowned by battlement, only interrupted by corner bartizans (crowned by circular roofs over plinths and cannon emplacements along the battery. Along the northern bastion is a closed balcony wall (typical of medieval designs) on three canals and with culverts. At the centre of the flat facade of the frontispiece is the arched portico surmounted by the coat-of-arms of Portugal and lateral volutes.

In the interior, is a small square framed by three constructions covered by rooftile with ramps providing access to adarve and rooftops. The quarter include vaulted ceilings and fireplaces.
