= Pimba =

Portuguese type of music

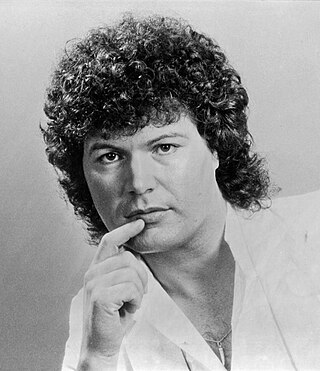
Marco Paulo, the forerunner of pimba music.

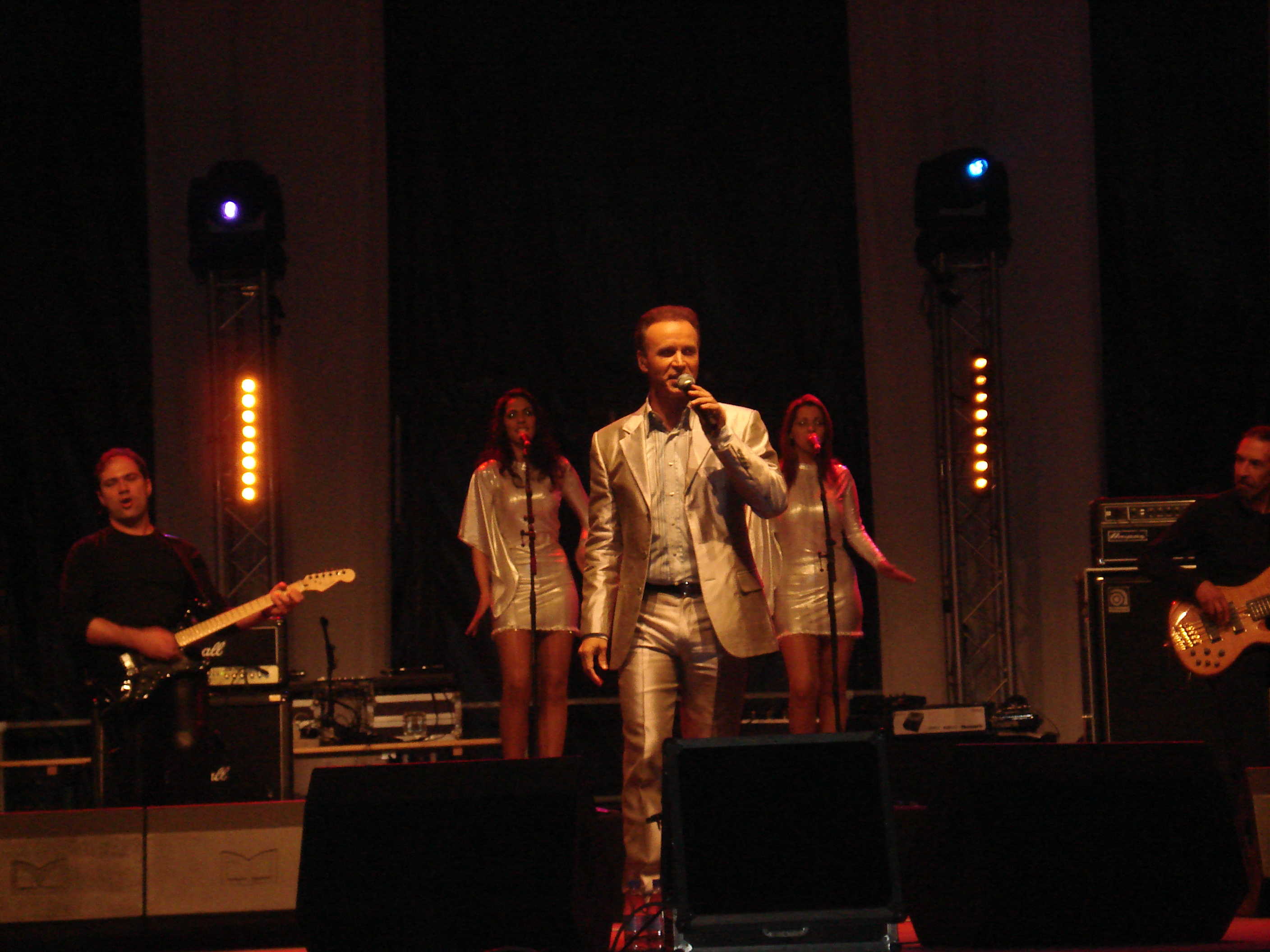
Emanuel, an icon of the pimba music scene.

Pimba is an umbrella term for Portuguese types or genres of music with an uptempo style and/or folk song features, and corny romantic or saucy and vulgar lyrics, which was often associated with poorly educated public from rural areas and suburban poor or working-class neighbourhoods, as well as with Portuguese economic migrants living abroad who spend their holidays in their ancestors' localities across the Portuguese countryside. The Portuguese word pimba by itself means a quick, unexpected event or the end of an action, and is also a slang code word for having any type of sexual pleasure with another person. A loose translation could be the English word bang when used to express an act of sexual intercourse or the expression "wham!". In the context of Portuguese music, the genre was christened Pimba after Emanuel's 1995 single called "Pimba Pimba".

== History ==
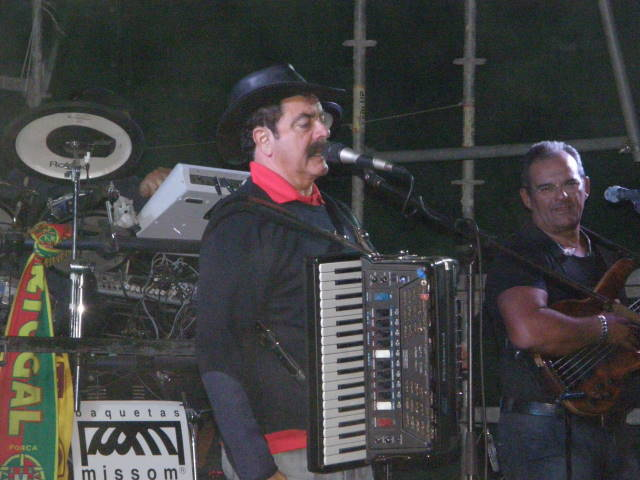
Quim Barreiros, one of the earliest Pimba music artists.

The genre began to have a greater popularity in the 1980s and reached its apogee in the 1990s. Pimba bands and musicians or singers are influenced by the rural areas of the Portuguese countryside and the economic emigration phenomenon which was common place in Portuguese life and the society throughout the 20th century. The Pimba genre is characterized by humorous lyrics, usually charged with sexual metaphors (like Rosinha's, Quim Barreiros' and Toy's songs), but it can also be used to refer to singers of overly sentimental lyrics (such as Marco Paulo, Tony Carreira, Dino Meira, Mónica Sintra and Ágata) who play in local festivities across the country, usually during the Summer season, where the overly vulgar or saucy music performances were also displayed. At the onset and for many years, Pimba music and musicians or bands were object of negative criticism by some music erudites and cultural authorities, although being often much more popular and profitable across Portugal and the Portuguese expat communities abroad than other more reputable genres.

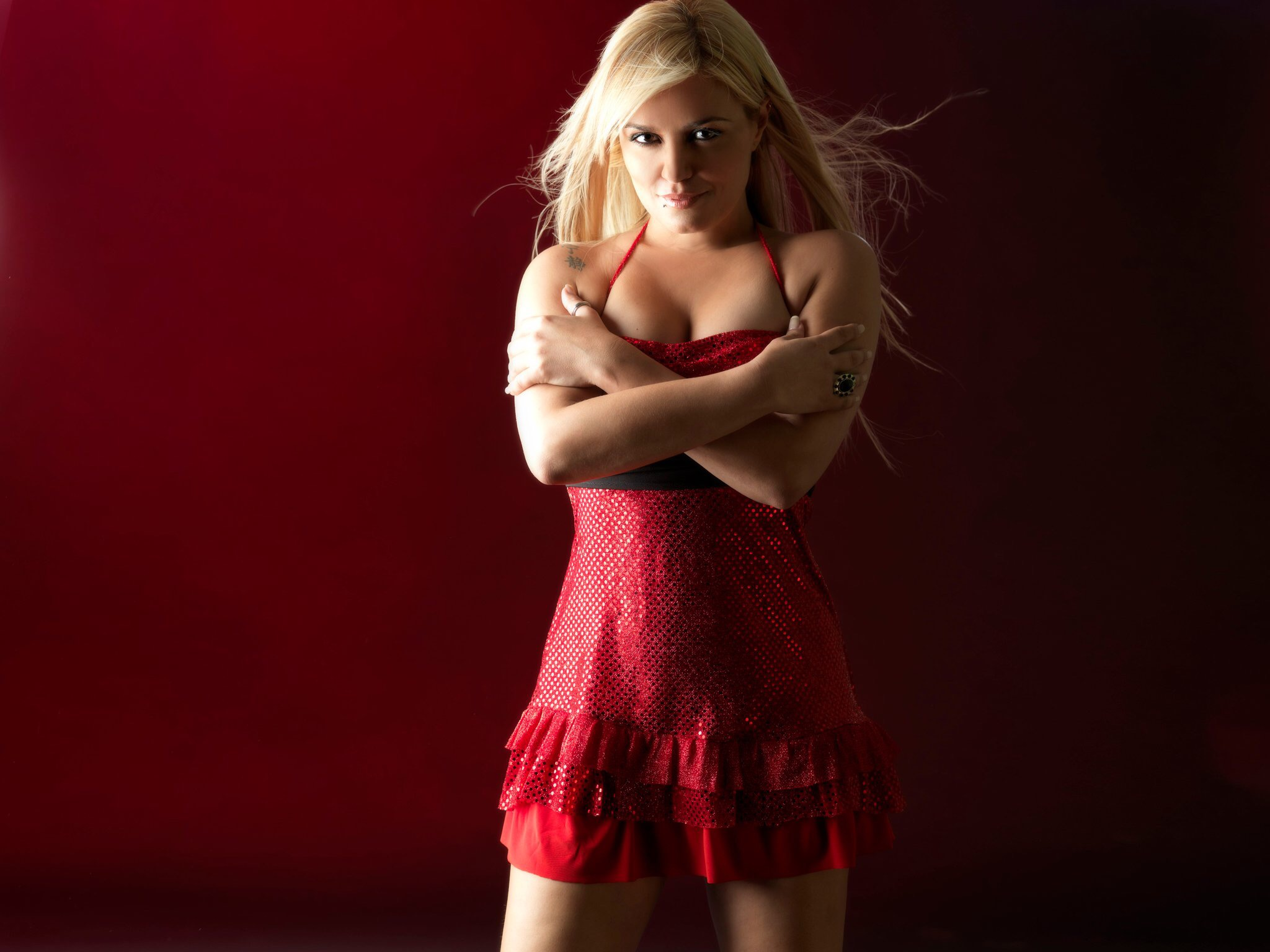
Ruth Marlene, female Pimba music singer.

The origins of Pimba as a genre are hard to define with precision, but Portuguese singer Emanuel's 1995 single called Pimba Pimba is regarded as a milestone in the genre's popularity explosion even after Quim Barreiros’ 1991 and 1992 songs Bacalhau à Portuguesa (O Bacalhau Quer Alho) and O Sorveteiro (Chupa Teresa) have reached such a huge success that the genre started to be widely sought-after and appreciated nationwide by then, although still just known as Portuguese folk (or popular) music instead of Pimba music. The single Pimba Pimba eventually gave its name to this music genre. Always present in local festivities and holidays of villages and towns across the entire country, that are often connected with religious holidays in honor of a patron saint of a local community, almost always in the Summer, Pimba singers also became a must in several major university and college festivals or festivities, such as the Queima das Fitas.

Other names who were highly successful throughout the glory days of the genre include Ana Malhoa and her father José Malhoa, the band Diapasão, Iran Costa, Fernando Correia Marques, Ruth Marlene, Micaela, Romana and Nel Monteiro.

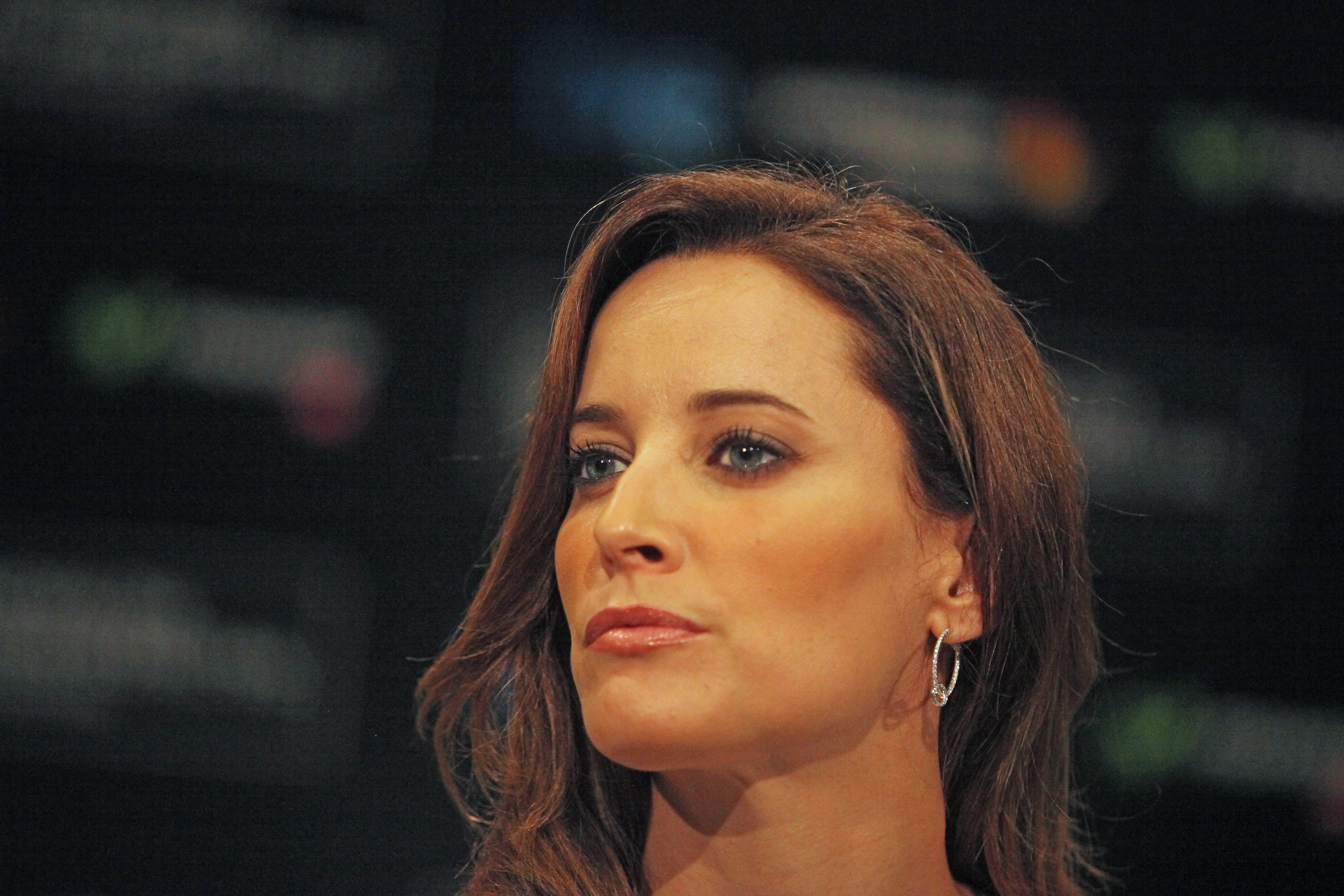
Portuguese actress Maria João Bastos at the International Film festival San Sebastián, Spain, on 22 September 2014.

Actress Maria João Bastos character Liliane Marise, a pimba music singer in the Portuguese telenovela Destinos Cruzados (2013/14), was so remarkable that the actress, impersonating the character, released a CD that reached first place in the Portuguese album chart and performed in Lisbon's MEO Arena in October 2013, and also in Guimarães on 2 November 2013. In 1998 and 1999, the pimba music scene, at its most mediatic point, was parodied in RTP's sitcom Débora, starred by Ana Bola.

== See also ==
- Schlager
- Turbo-Folk
