= Areosa Fort =

- Forte da Areosa
- Areosa, Portugal
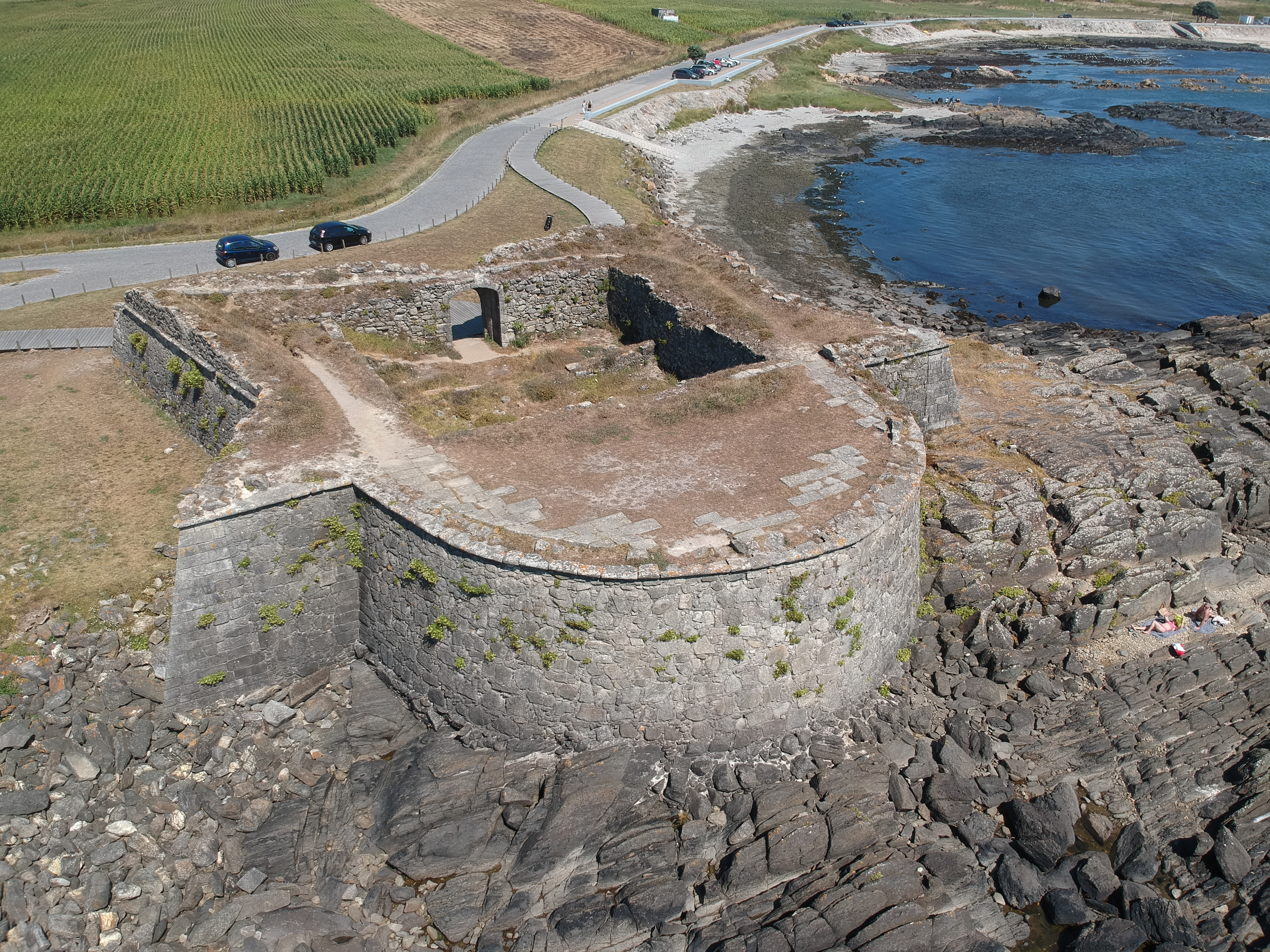
- Aerial photograph of the Areosa Fort

Site information
- Type: Bastion fort
- Condition: Ruined

Location
- Coordinates: 41°47′52″N 8°52′26″W

Site history
- Built: 17th century

the Areosa Fort (Forte da Areosa in Portuguese), also referred to as Areosa Fortlet (Fortim da Areosa in Portuguese), is located in the place of Rego de Fontes, by the bay of Vinha, in the village and parish of Areosa, in the municipality of Caminha, district of Viana do Castelo, in Portugal.

It is classified as a "Property of Public Interest" since 1970.

== History ==
It was built during the War of Restoration of Portuguese Independence (1640–1668), and was one of three similar forts built along the coast between Caminha and Viana do Castelo with the aim of strengthening the defense of the Atlantic coast of Alto Minho, vulnerable to possible attacks by pirates or the Spanish navy, the others being the Fort of Cão in Gelfa and Montedor Fort in Vila Praia de Âncora. These reinforced the Ínsua Fort, built during that conflict to defend the mouth of the Minho River.

At the time, existing fortifications such as the Valença fortress, the Castle of Vila Nova de Cerveira and the fort Santiago da Barra were renovated. To complement the defense of the left (south) bank of the Minho River, the Fort São Francisco de Lovelhe was built in Vila Nova de Cerveira.

In 1983, the property was handed to the Regional Tourism Board (since extinct), when it was considered for tourist and cultural use. In 2000, a project was prepared, by the architect Luís Teles, to adapt the fort to an interpretation and support center for environmental routes.

== Features ==
A bastioned coastal fort, of small dimensions and simple design, it has a star-shaped plan in the Mannerist style, consisting of four unequal bastions. The side facing the sea is curved, the opposite side being concave. In the latter, the gate-of-arms is a perfect arch. In its interior are the service quarters, besides a corridor in the center of the fort that serves as a courtyard.

It's similar to the forts of Montedor and Cão, whose plan constituted, at the time, an advance in the system for coastal watch and defense. It is believed that this set of three similar coastal forts may have been designed by the architect Manuel Pinto Villa Lobos.

== Gallery ==
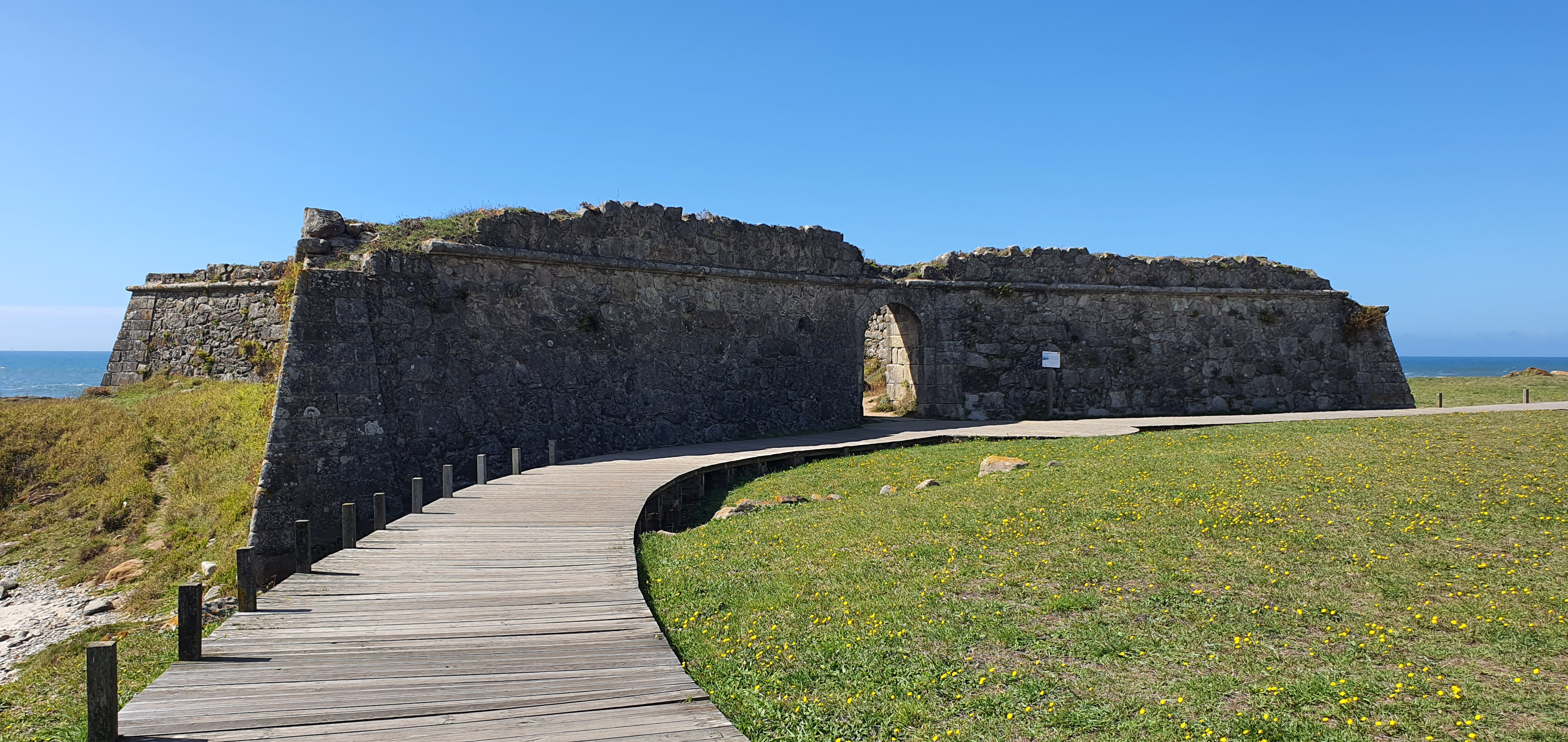
Landside view

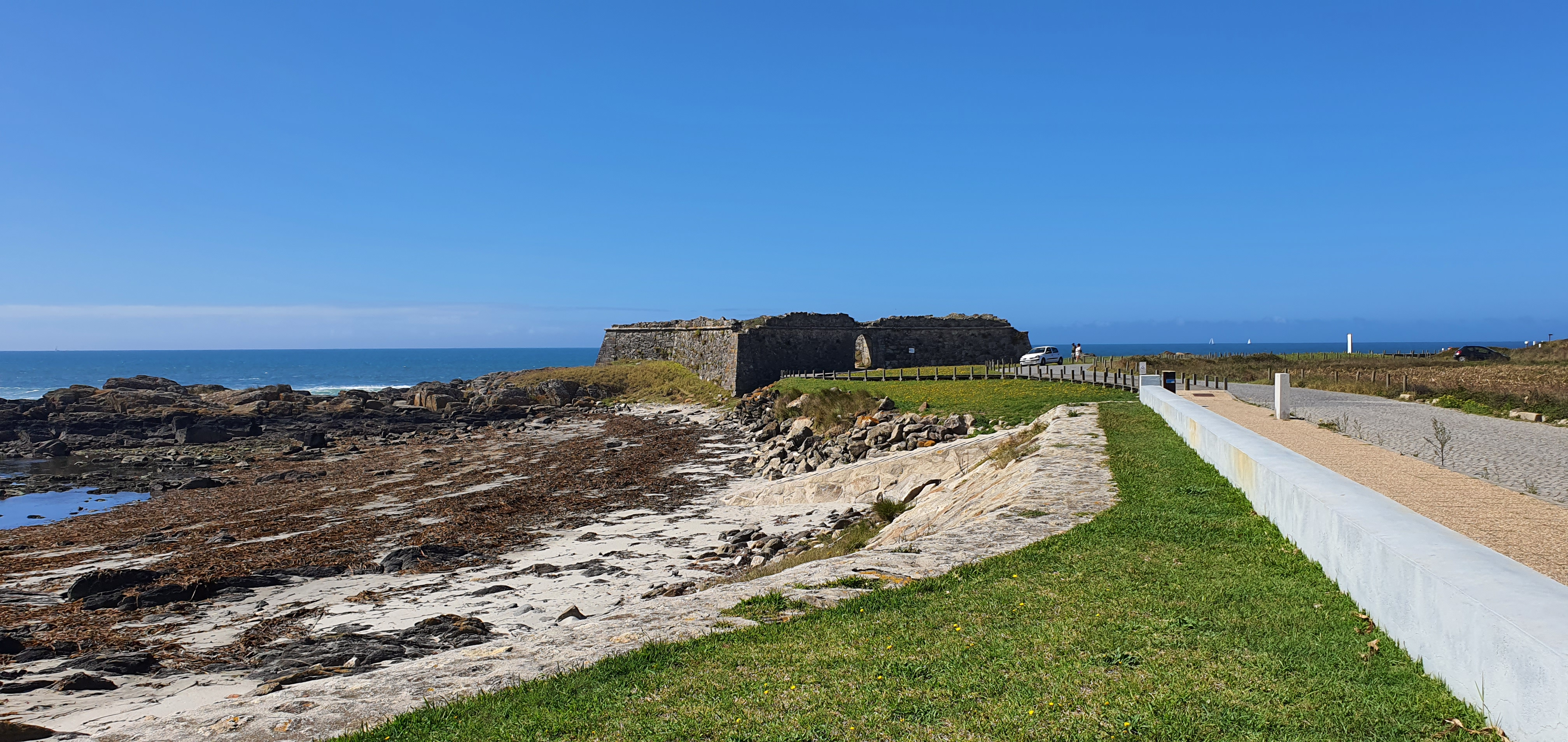
Far view

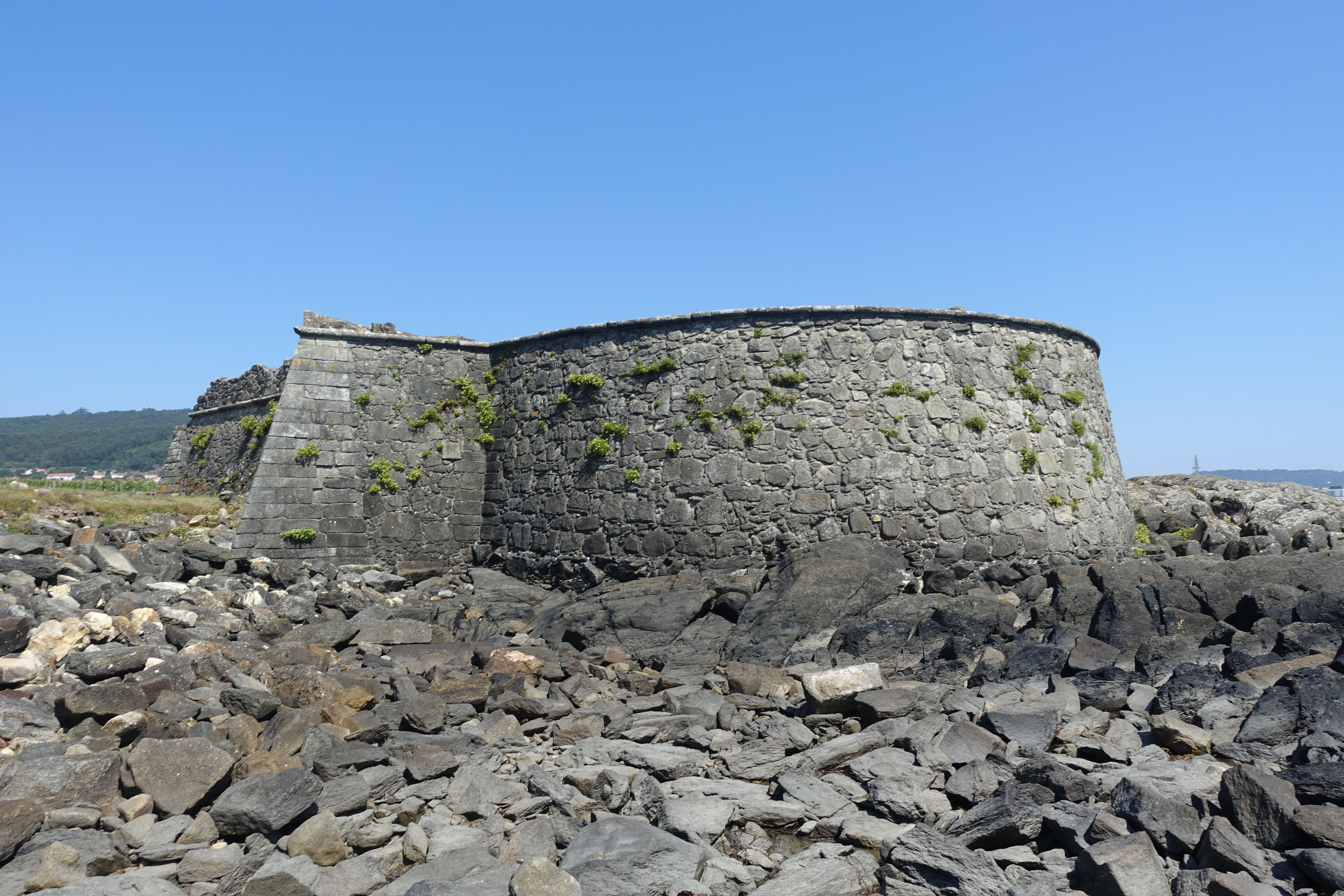
Sea side bastion

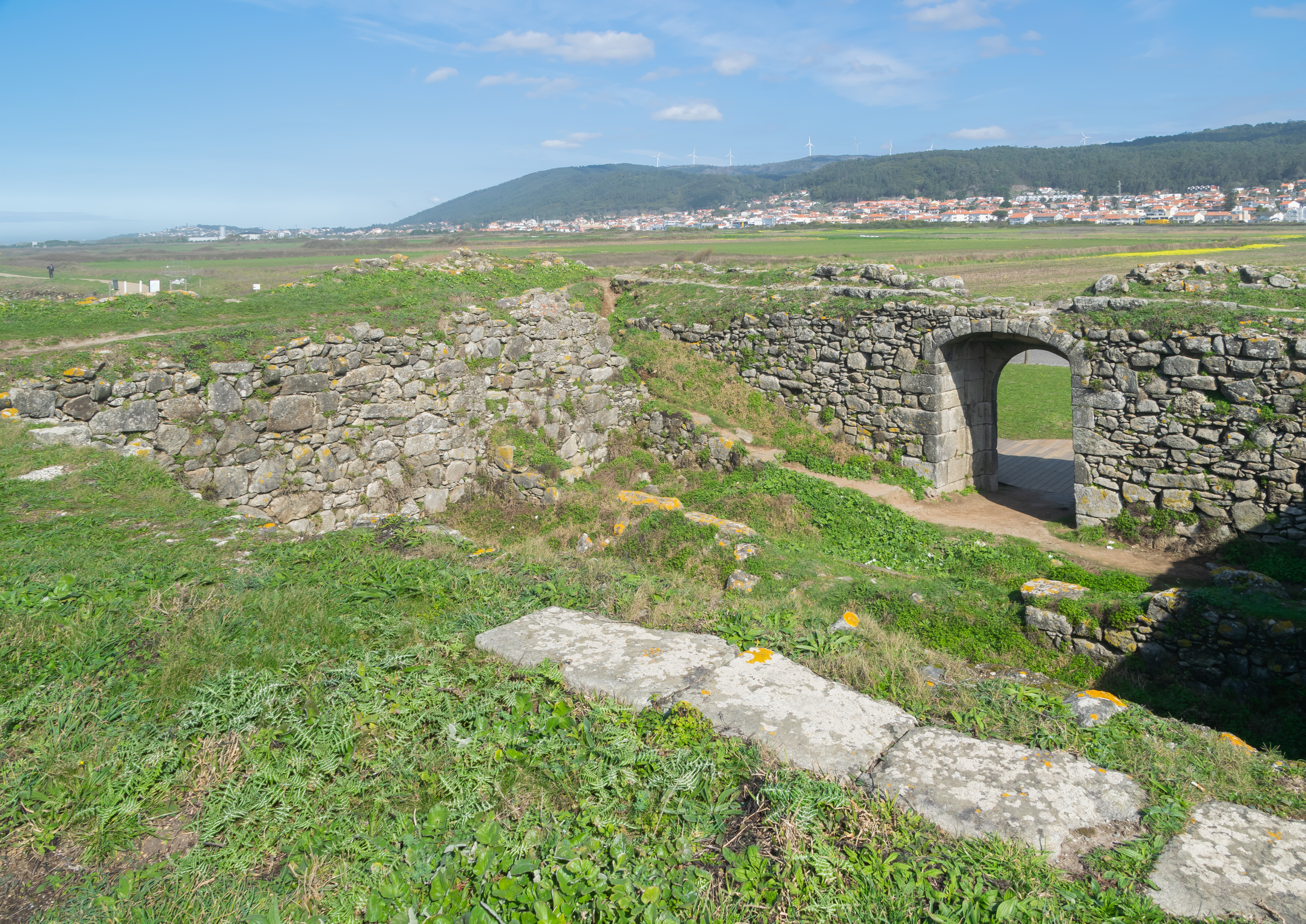
Courtyard
