= Montedor Fort =

- Forte de Montedor
- Carreço, Portugal
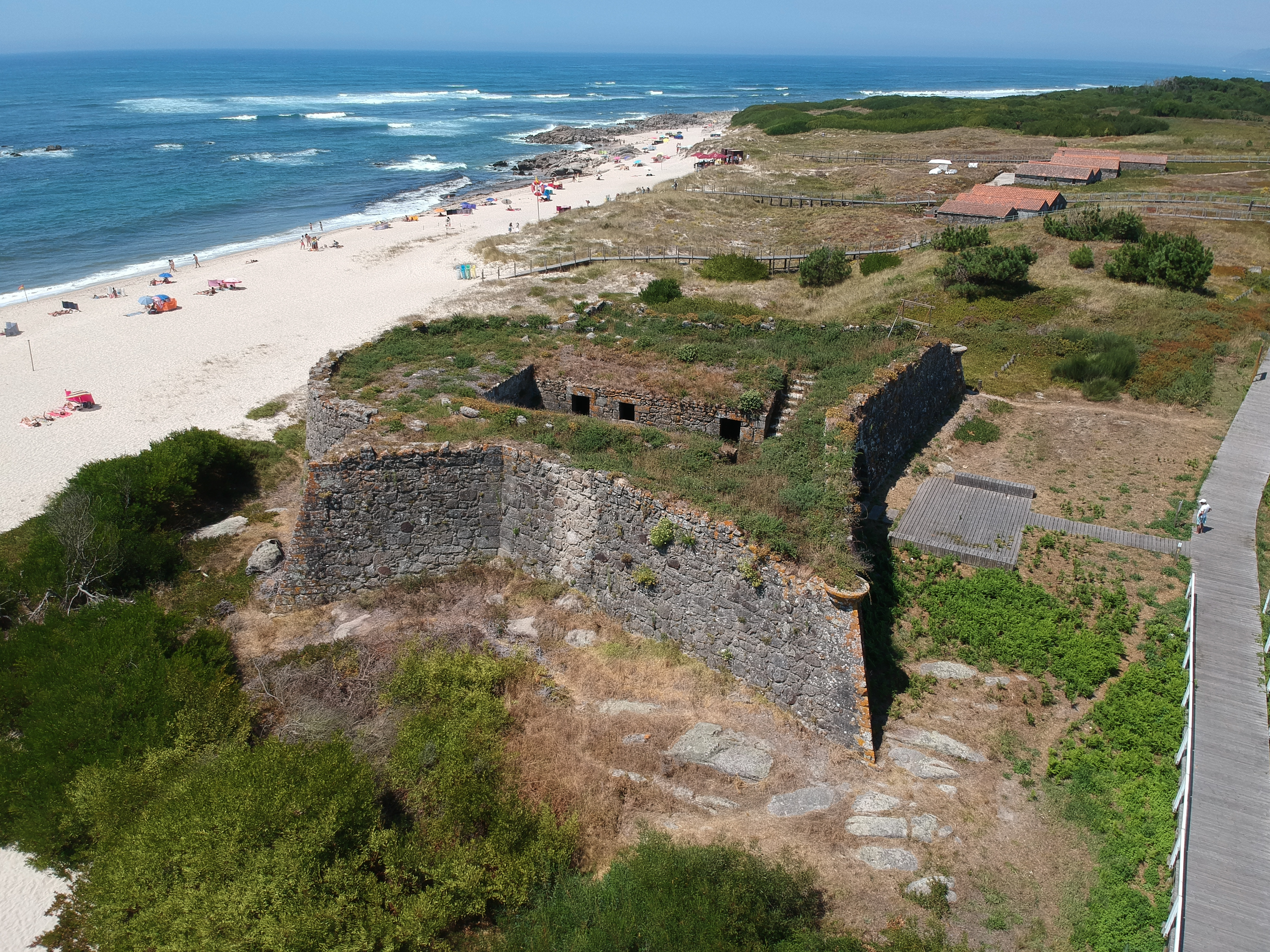
- Aerial photograph of the Montedor Fort

Site information
- Type: Bastion fort
- Condition: Ruined

Location
- Coordinates: 41°45′32″N 8°52′35″W

Site history
- Built: Second half of the 17th century
- In use: 18th century
- Events: Peninsular War; Portuguese Civil War

The Montedor Fort (Forte de Montedor in Portuguese), also referred to as Montedor Fortlet (Fortim de Montedor in Portuguese) or Paçô Fort (Forte de Paçô in Portuguese), is located on Paçô beach, in the parish of Carreço, municipality of Viana do Castelo, in Portugal.

It is classified as a Property of Public Interest by Decree No. 47,508, published in DG No. 20, of 24 January 1967.

== History ==
With the end of the War of Restoration (1640-1668), it was one of three similar forts built along the coast between Caminha and Viana do Castelo with the aim of strengthening the defense of the Atlantic coast of Alto Minho, vulnerable to possible attacks by pirates or the Spanish navy, the others being the Fort of Cão in Gelfa and Fort of Lagarteira in Vila Praia de Âncora. These were added to the Ínsua Fort, built during that conflict to defend the mouth of the Minho River.

At the time, existing fortifications such as the Valença fortress, the Castle of Vila Nova de Cerveira and the fort Santiago da Barra were renovated. To complement the defense of the left (south) bank of the Minho River, the Fort São Francisco de Lovelhe was built in Vila Nova de Cerveira.

It was deactivated in 1716.

In 1984, the property was handed to the Regional Tourism Board (since extinct), when it was considered for tourist and cultural use. In 1995, a project was prepared, by the architect Luís Teles, to adapt the fort to a restaurant, later replaced by another project, by the same architect, for the installation of an interpretation and support center for environmental routes.

In 2004 the property underwent conservation and restoration intervention.

== Features ==
A bastioned coastal fort, of small dimensions and simple design, it has a star-shaped plan in the Mannerist style, consisting of four unequal bastions. The side facing the sea is curved, the opposite side being concave. In the latter, the gate-of-arms is a perfect arch. In its interior are the service quarters, besides a corridor in the center of the fort that serves as a courtyard.

It's similar to the forts of Areosa and Cão, whose plan constituted, at the time, an advance in the system for coastal watch and defense. It is believed that this set of coastal forts may have been designed by the architect Manuel Pinto Villa Lobos.

== Gallery ==
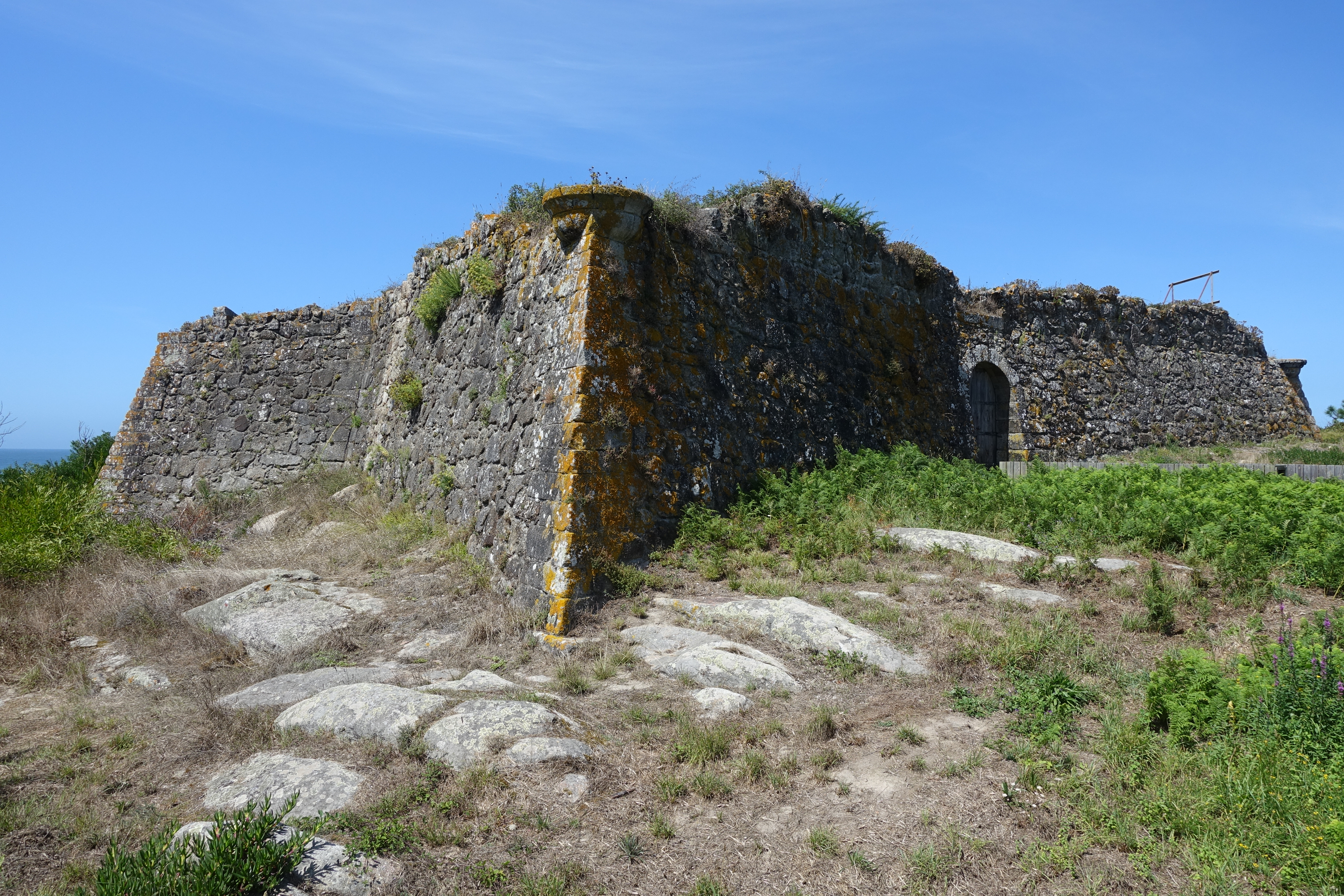
South-east bastion

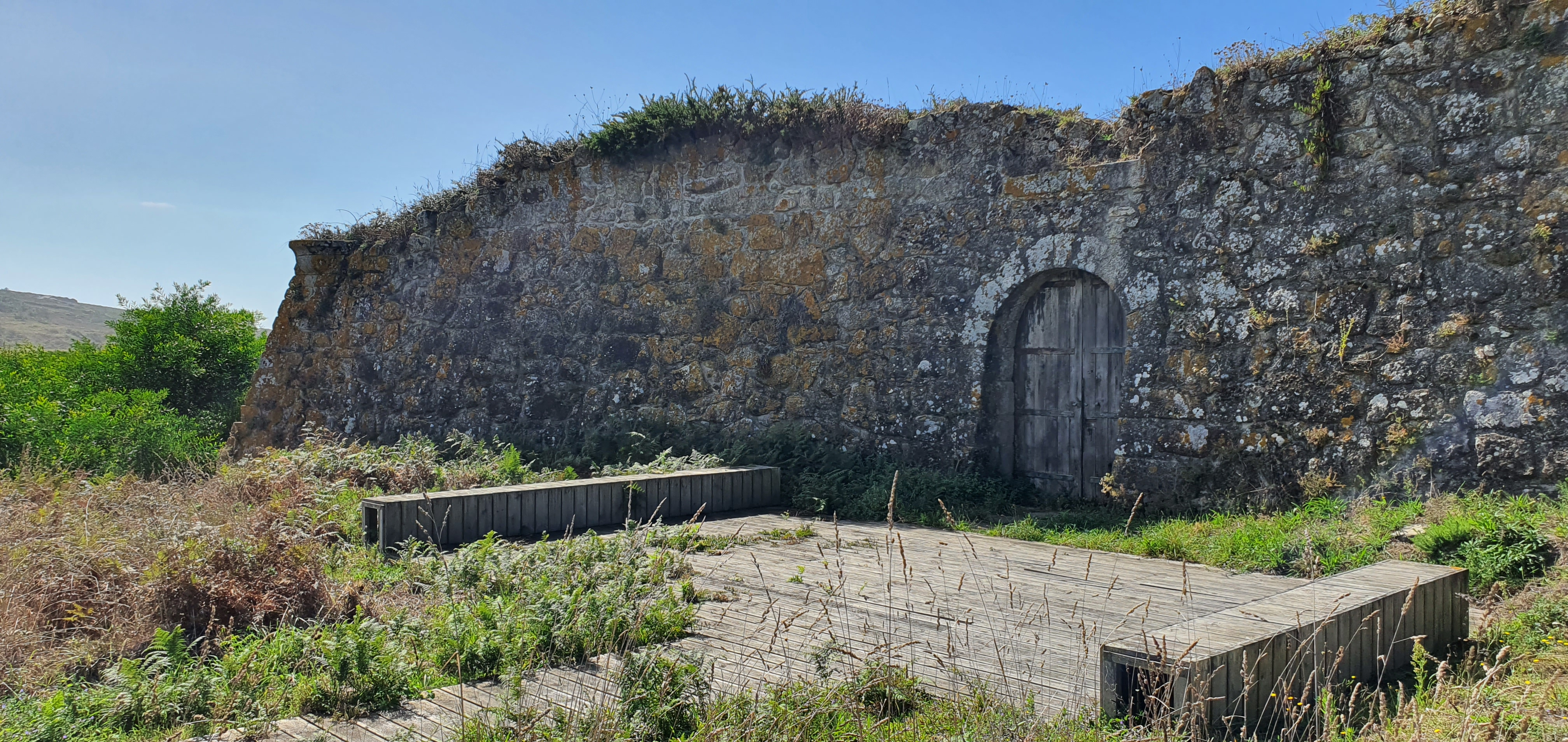
Land side

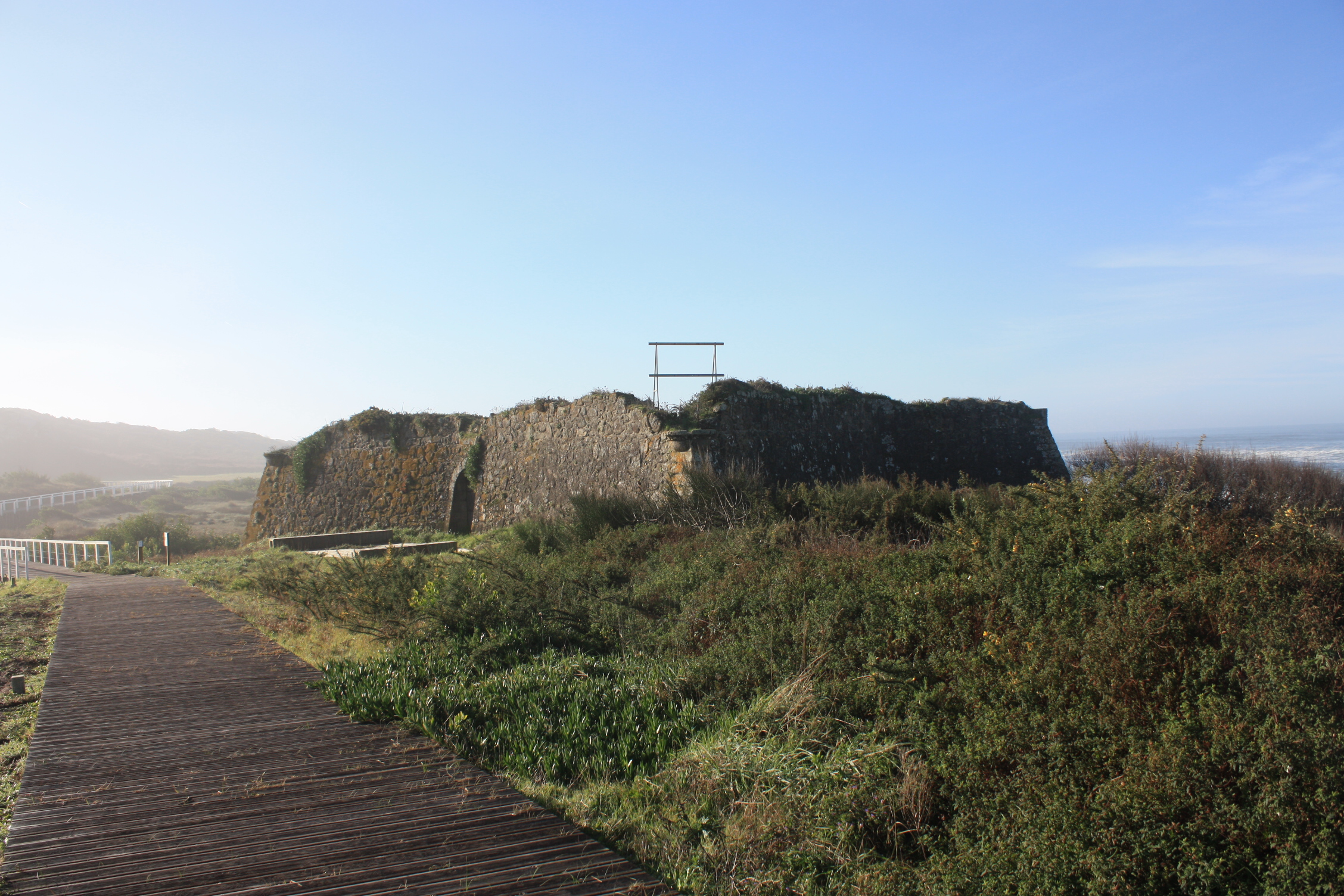
North view

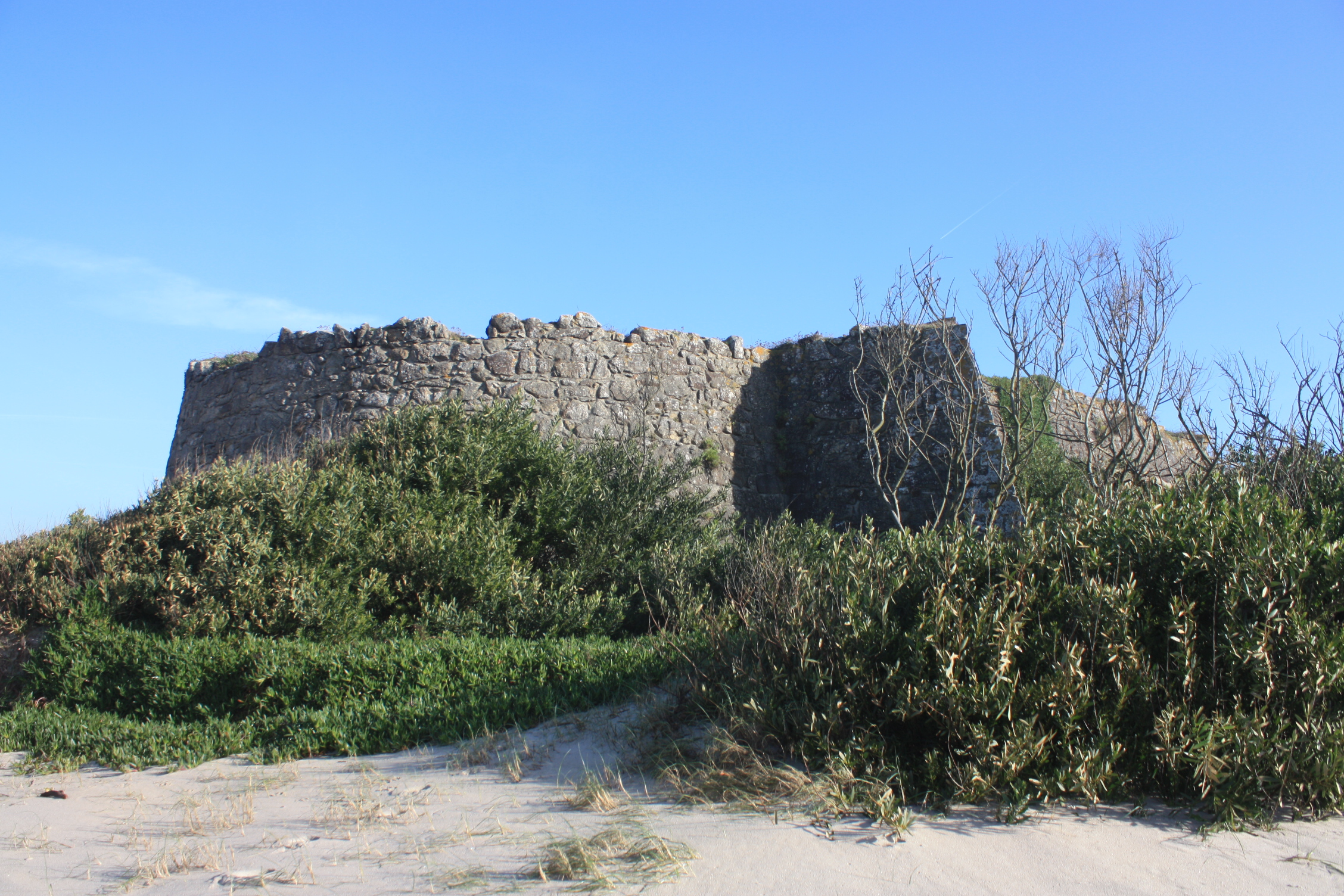
Seaside bastion

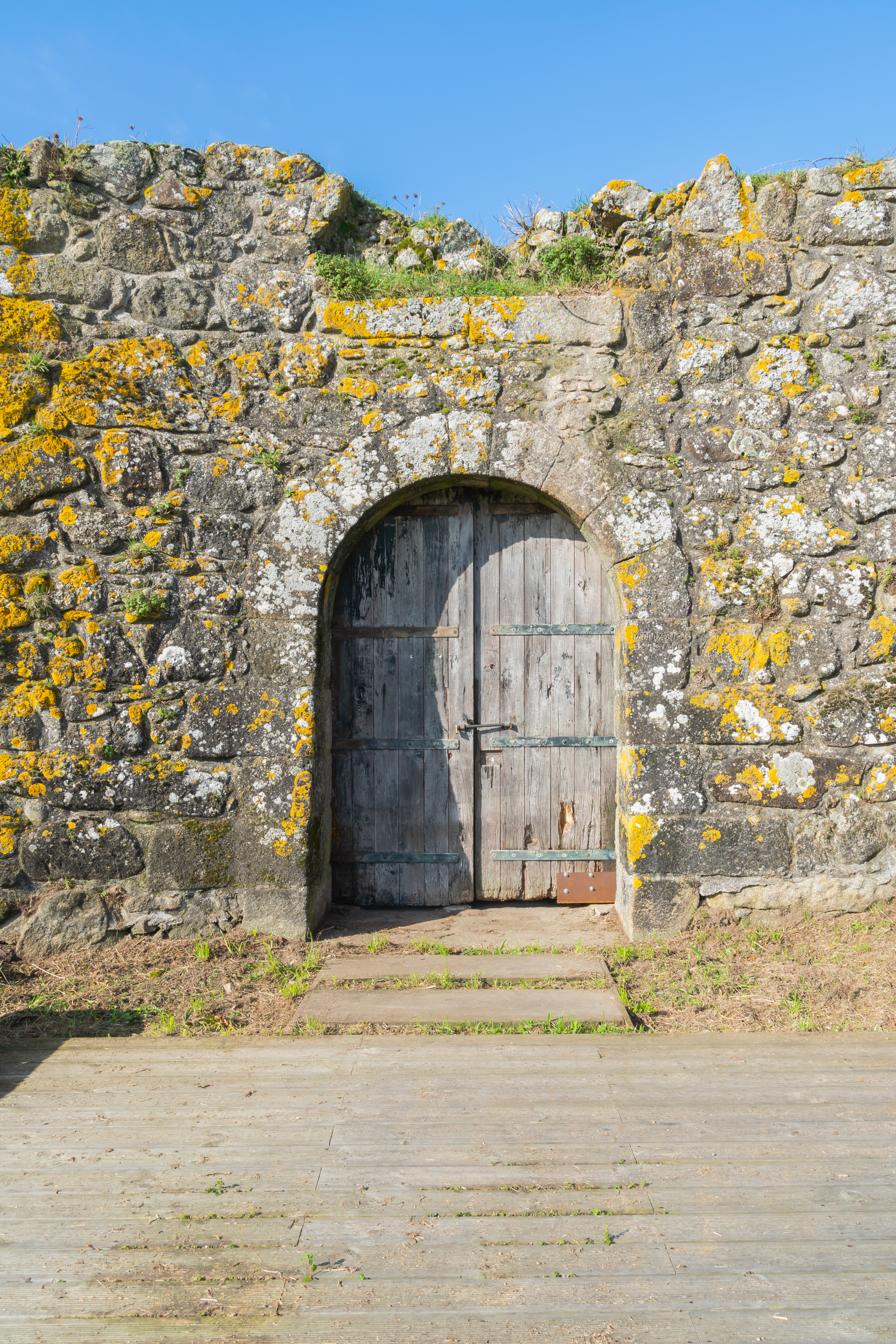
Gate

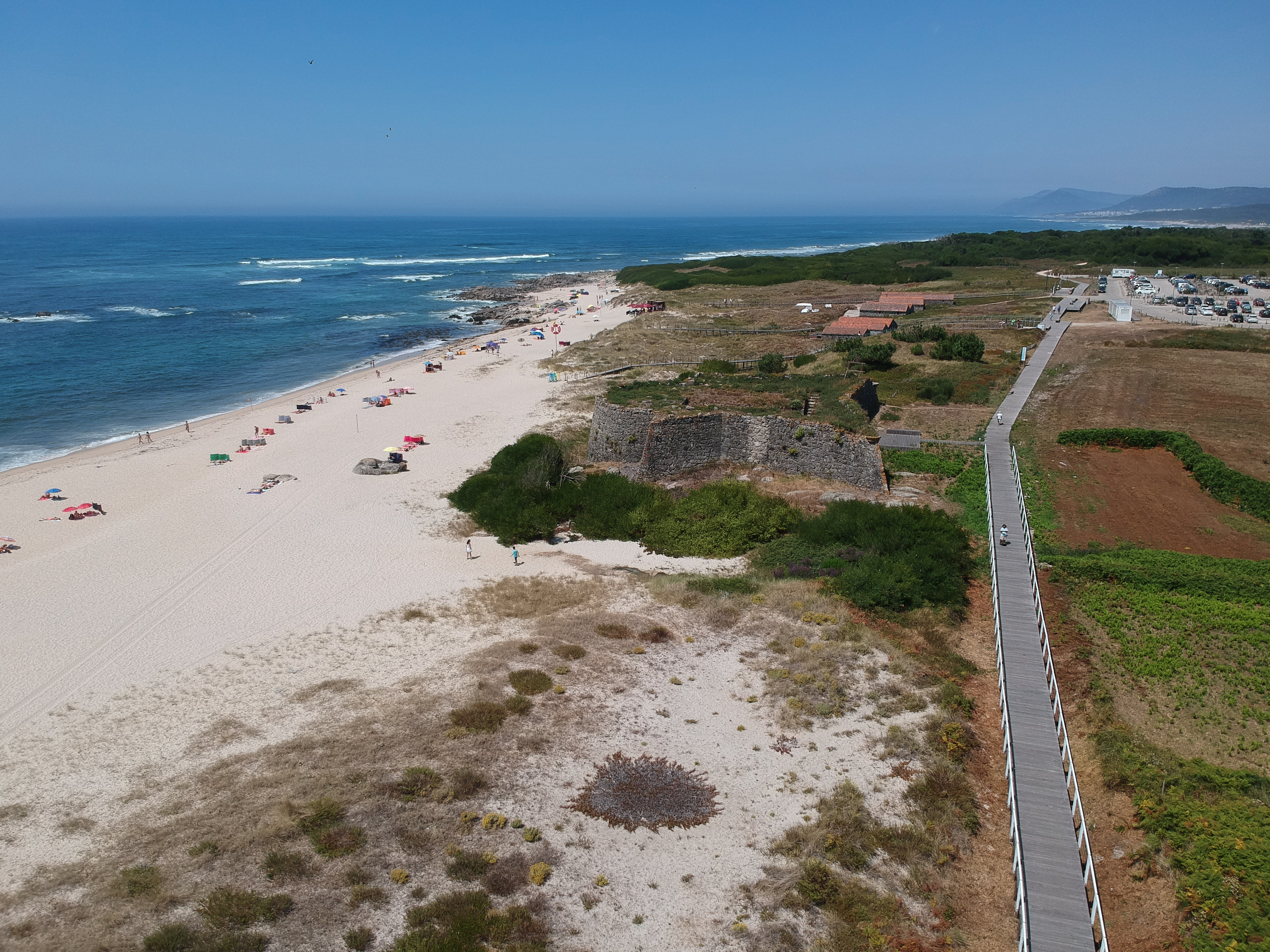
Aerial view
