= Sopo =

Sopo may refer to:

- Sopó, a town in Colombia
- Sopo (structure), a storage or granary structure in Batak Toba culture
- Sopo River, a river in South Sudan
- Sopo, Portugal, a town in Portugal
- A nickname for South Portland, Maine, USA
- Sopo, a fictional character in Adit Sopo Jarwo

== See also ==
- Korean cannon—for "so-po"
