= Fort of Cão =

- Forte do Cão
- Âncora, Portugal
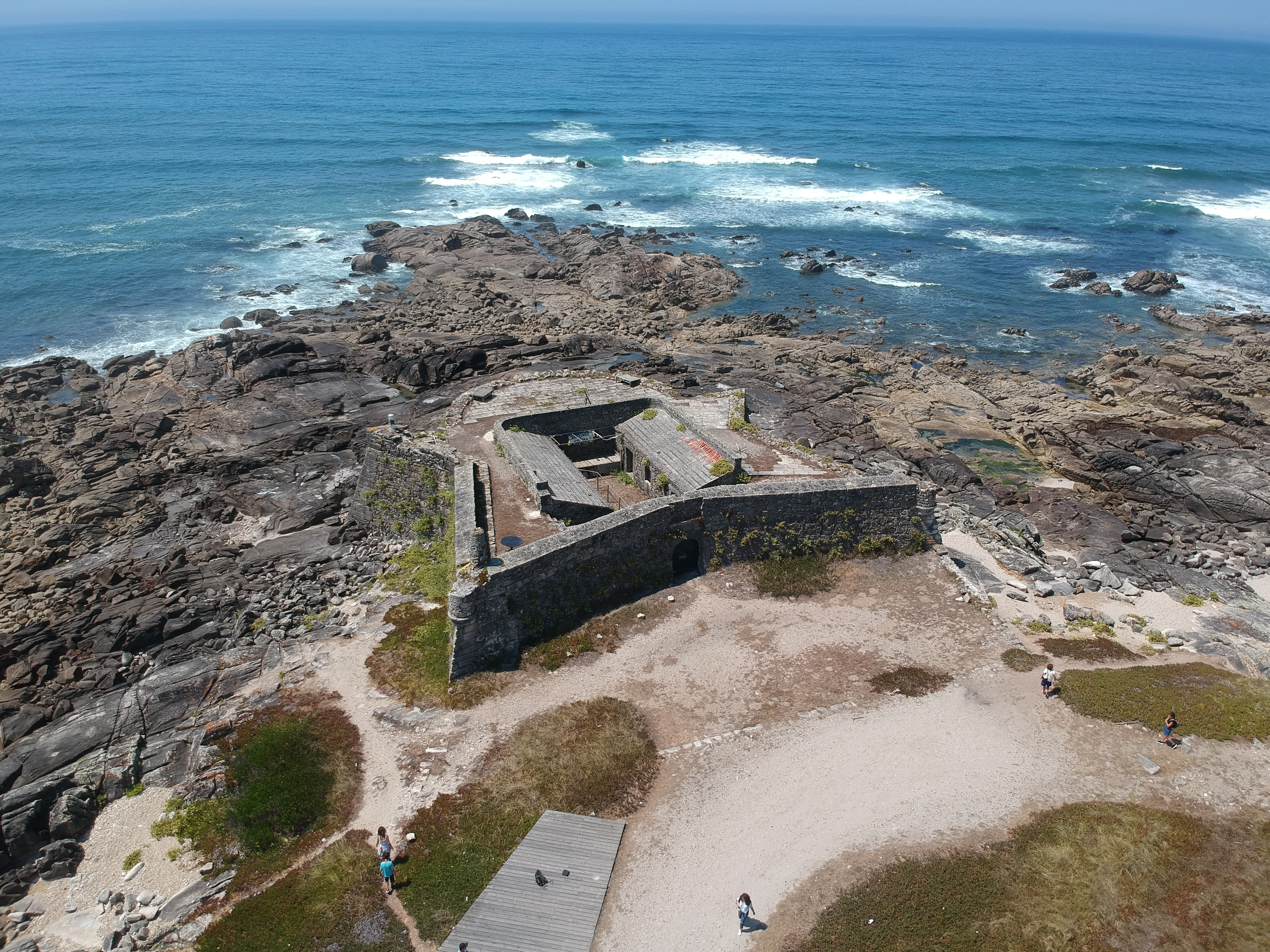
- Aerial photograph of the Fort of Cão

Site information
- Type: Bastion fort
- Condition: Ruined

Location
- Coordinates: 41°47′52″N 8°52′26″W

Site history
- Built: 1699-1702
- In use: 18th century

The Fort of Cão (Forte do Cão in Portuguese), also referred to as Fortlet of Cão (Fortim do Cão in Portuguese), is located in the place of Gelfa, by the Gelfa Beach and Gelfa Woodland, south of the village and parish of Âncora, in the municipality of Caminha, district of Viana do Castelo, in Portugal.

== History ==
It was one of four forts built during the reign of King Peter II on the coast between Caminha and Viana do Castelo with the aim of strengthening the defense of the Atlantic coast of Alto Minho, vulnerable to possible attacks by pirates or the Spanish Armada, after the end of the War of Restoration of Independence (1640-1668). The others were the Forte de Vinha, in Areosa, the Fort of Montedor in Carreço, and the Forte of Lagarteira in Vila Praia de Âncora. These were added to the Ínsua Fort, built during that conflict to defend the southern bar of the Minho River.

At the line, existing fortifications such as the Fortress of Valença, the Castle of Vila Nova de Cerveira and the Fort Santiago da Barra were renovated. To complement the defense of the left (south) bank of the Minho River, the Fort São Francisco de Lovelhe was built in Vila Nova de Cerveira.

The Cão fort was built between 1699 and 1702, with the function of defending that stretch of coast, at the mouth of the Âncora river, helping the defense provided by the Caminha stronghold.

It was deactivated in 1716, and its garrison withdrawn, though it maintained a commander.

It is registered as a Property of Public Interest by Decree No. 47,508, published in DG No. 20, of January 24, 1967, rectified in DG No. 59, of March 10, 1967, and by Decree No. 95/78, published in DR No. 210, of September 12, 1978.

== Features ==
A coastal bastion fort, of small dimensions and simple features, it has a star-shaped plan in the Mannerist style, consisting of four unequal bastions. The side facing the sea is curved, the opposite side being concave. In this one, the gate-of-arms consists of a perfect arch. In its interior were the service dependencies, around a courtyard that formed a corridor in the center of the fort.

Its structural typology presents similarities with the forts of Areosa and Montedor, whose plan constituted, at the time, an advance in the defense and watch system. It is believed that this set of coastal forts may have been designed by the same architect.

== Gallery ==
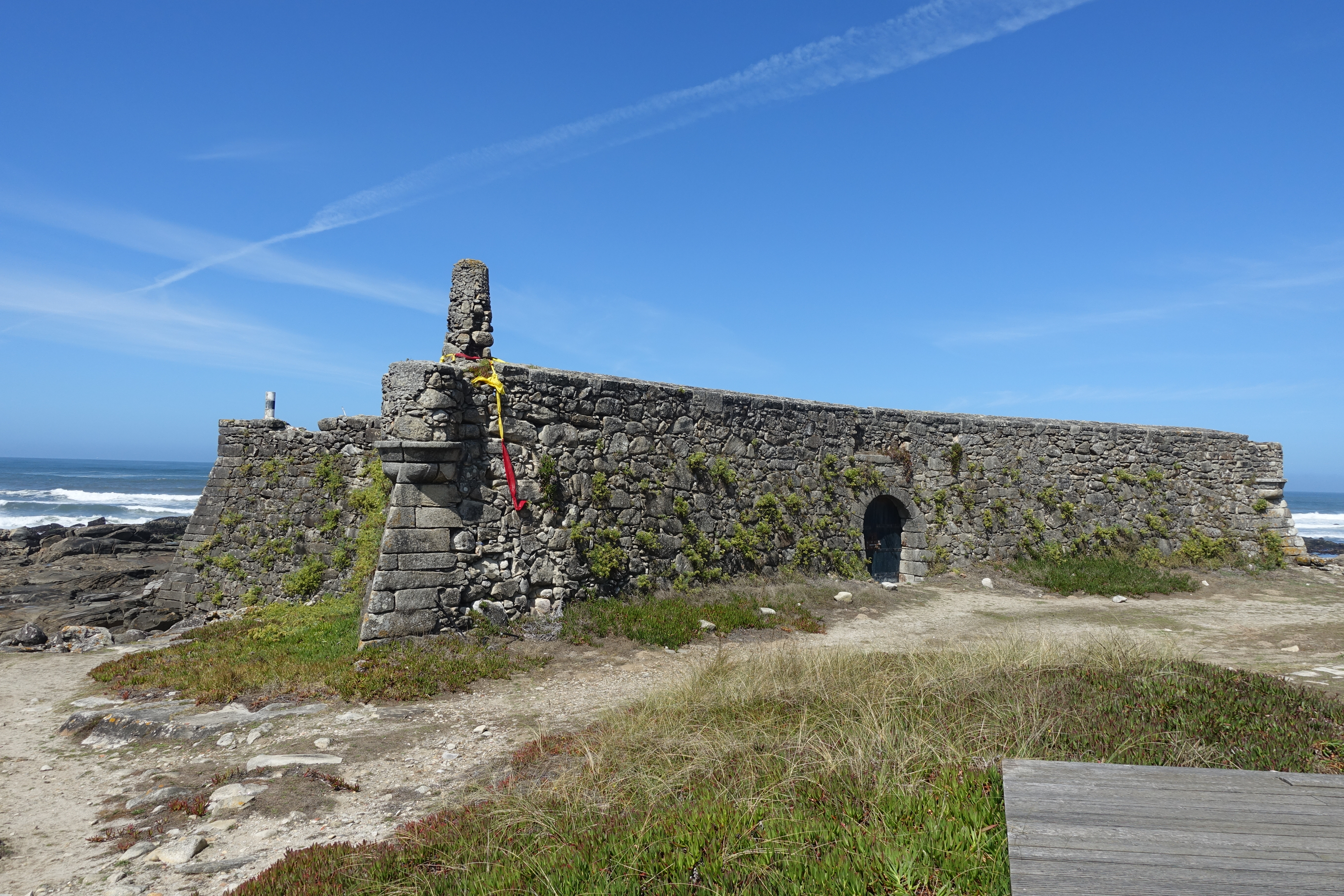

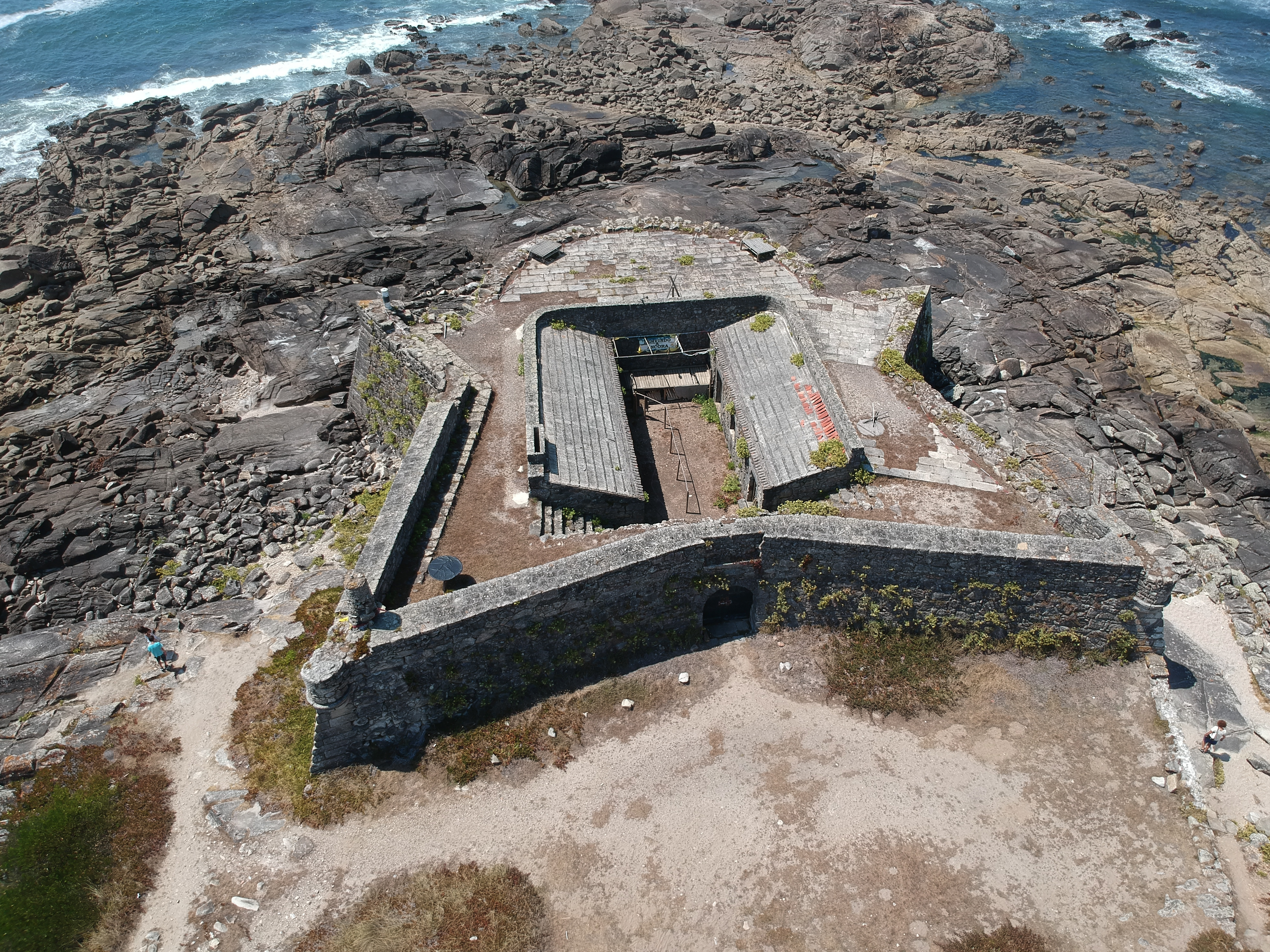

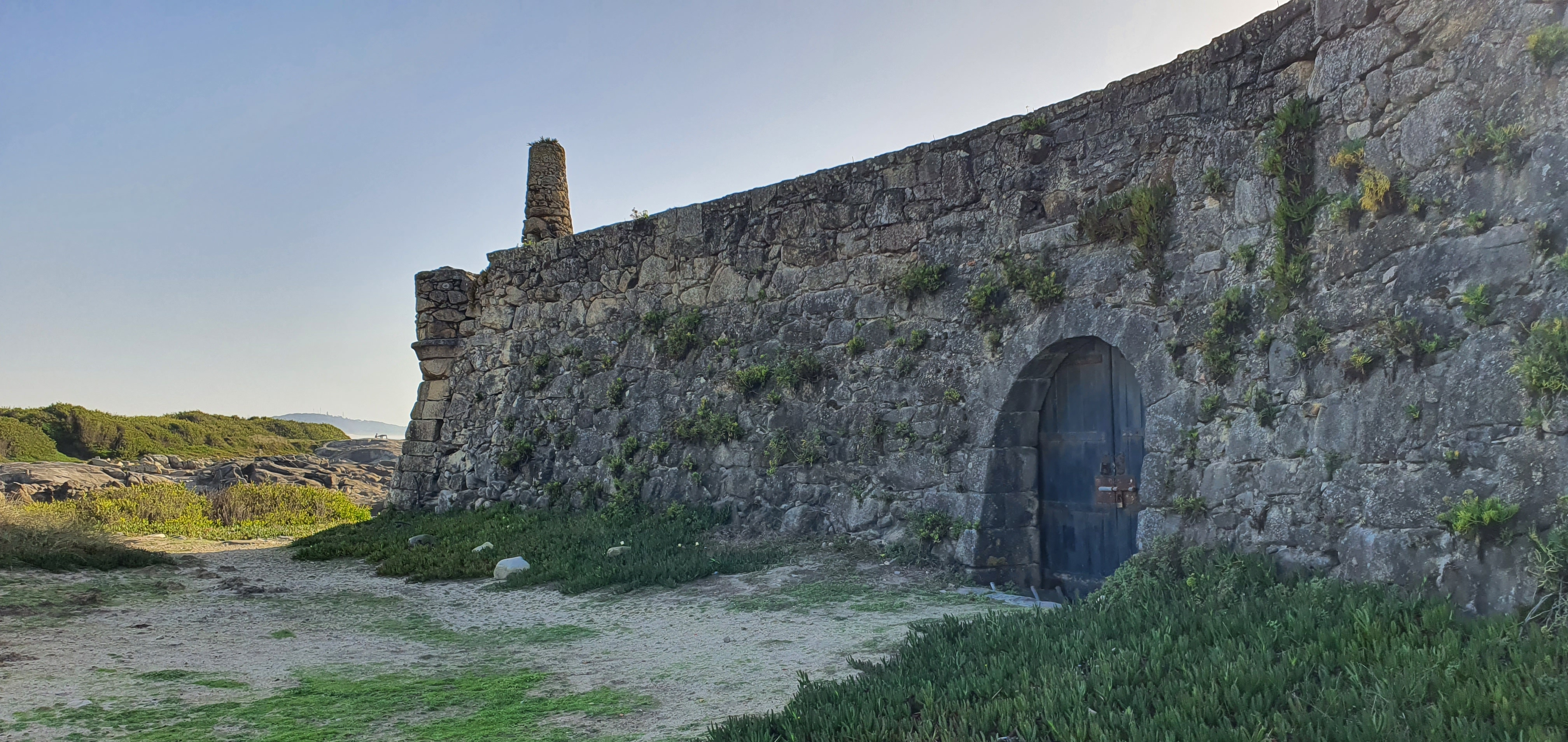

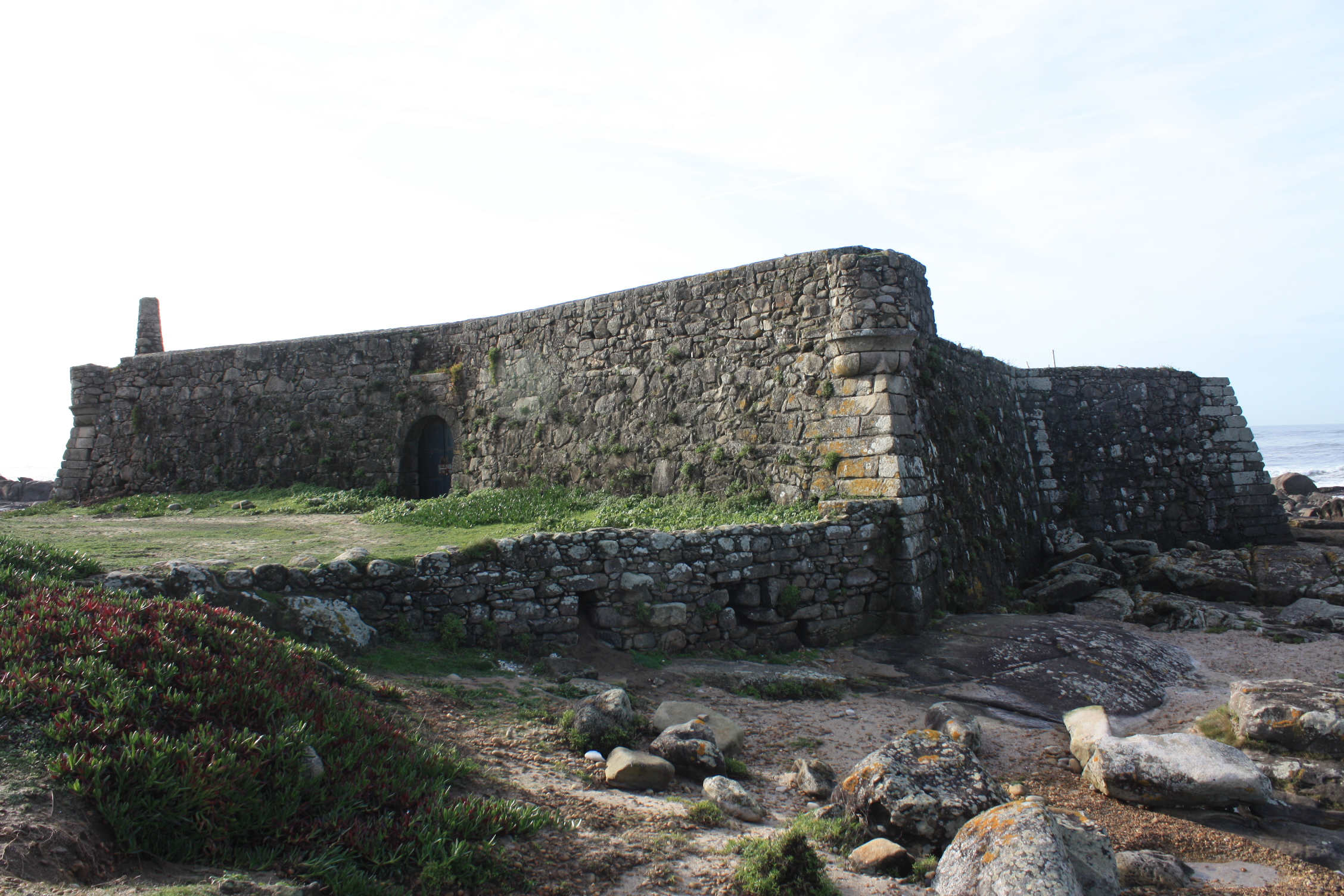

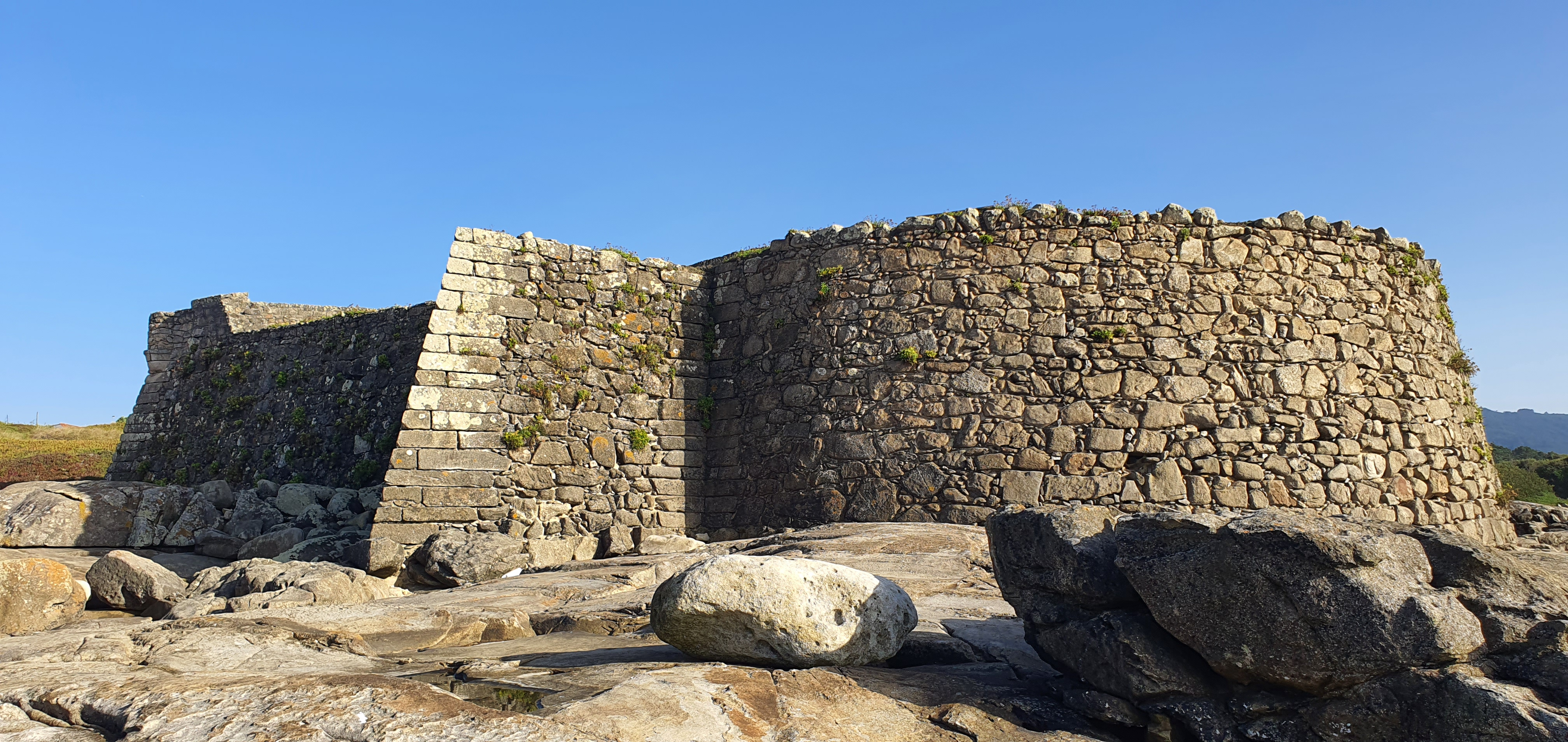
