= Sopo, Portugal =

Sopo
- Civil parish
- Location in Portugal
- Coordinates: 41.902°N 8.741°W
- Country: Portugal
- Region: Norte
- Intermunic. comm.: Alto Minho
- District: Viana do Castelo
- Municipality: Vila Nova de Cerveira

Area
  - Total: 14.82 km^{2} (5.72 sq mi)

Population (2011)
  - Total: 557
  - Density: 37.6/km^{2} (97.3/sq mi)
- Time zone: UTC+00:00 (WET)
  - Summer (DST): UTC+01:00 (WEST)
- Postal code: 4920
- Patron: São Tiago
- Website: http://www.jf-sopo.com

Sopo is a civil parish in the municipality of Vila Nova de Cerveira in the Portuguese northern district of Viana do Castelo. The population in 2011 was 557, in an area of 14.82 km².

== History ==
References from 1258 identify the existence of several churches situated between the Lima and Minho Rivers, and that one of these churches, named Zopo, belonged to the Bishop of Tui.

By the beginning of the 16th century, the parish of Sopo was part of the Archdiocese of Braga and belonged to the municipality of Caminha; comparably, Sopo was part of this municipality by 1546. A 1580 census completed by friar Baltasar Limpo, in order to determine the condition of the deaconship, referred to the parish of Santiago de Sopo within the comarca of Caminha, an area that was divided between the clergy of the archbishop and other lay clergy. Archbishop D. Diogo de Sousa confirmed a donation to Sopo, completed by several people to the Marquis of Vila Real. The Marquis, later, transferred the patronage of Sopo to his son, the Duke of Caminha, who was, along with his father, implicated in the conspiracy against John IV.

By 1839, Sopo was part of the municipality of Monção, and later (1859), in the municipality of Valença. It was annexed to the municipality of Caminha by decree on 12 July 1895.

Sopo became a part of the Diocese of Viana do Castelo after 3 November 3, 1977.

Eventually Sopo was integrated into the municipality of Vila Nova de Cerveira on 13 January 1989.

== Geography ==
According to the Portuguese Postal Service CTT, there are 23 localities in Sopo: Aldeia, Assamonde, Barreira, Barros, Bouça, Cabral, Campo Redondo, Carvalha, Chãos, Cimo de Vila, Cortinhas, Costa, Curros, Espinhosa, France, Gavea, Pardelhas, Pinheiro Manso, Quinta, Rodetes, Senra, Trás do Outeiro and Vale.

== Economy ==
Sopo includes several industries associated with agriculture, livestock, baking and hydro-electrical production.

== Architecture ==
- Chapel of Quinta da Parede Nova
- Chapel of Santo Aldão
- Chapel of Santo André
- Chapel of São Gregório
- Chapel of São João
- Chapel of Senhora da Guia
- Chapel of San Sebastiao
- Church of São Tiago
- Cross of Senhora da Piedade

== Culture ==
There are several festivals that mark the communities activities throughout the year: the Festival of Our Lady of Agony (Portuguese: Festa de Senhora de Agonia); Festival of St. James (Portuguese: Festa de S. Tiago); Festival of St. John (Portuguese: Festa de S. João); Festival of St. Andrew (Portuguese: Festa de Santo André).

Sopo specializes in the following culinary dishes: Lamprey Eel Rice (Portuguese: Arroz de lampreia); Pork Stew (Portuguese: Sarrabulho) and Pork Sausage (Portuguese: Enchidos de porco).

Sopo has the following social groups and clubs: Sopo Folklore Dance and Music Club (Portuguese: Rancho Folclórico da Freguesia de Sopo); Sopo Sports Club (Portuguese: Clube Desportivo de Sopo); Drums of St. James Cultural and Recreational Association (Portuguese: Associação Cultural e Recreativa Bombos de S. Tiago de Sopo)
