= Vila Nova de Cerveira =

- Municipality
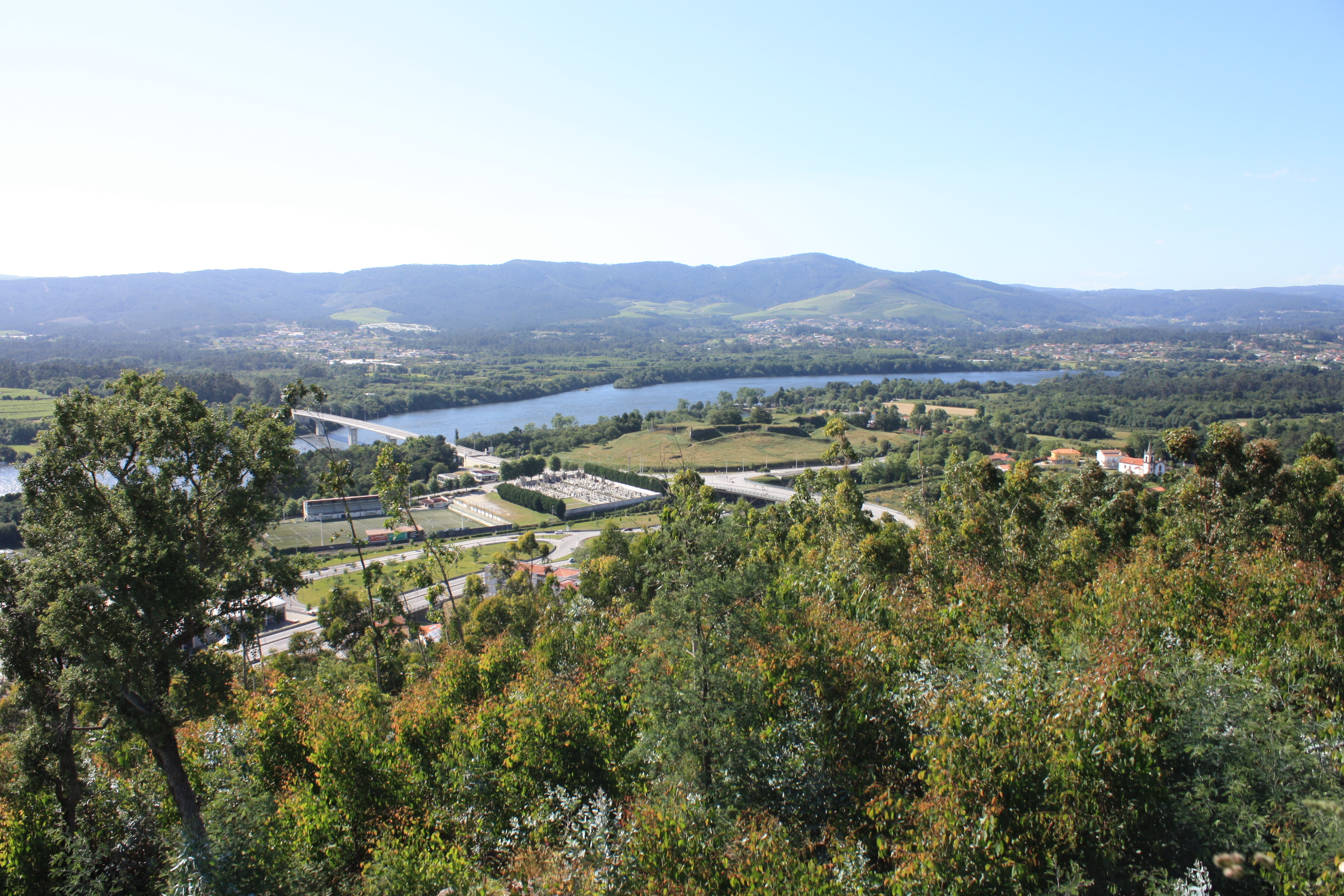
- Portugal-Spain border divided by the Minho River. Taken from Atalaia de Lovelhe.

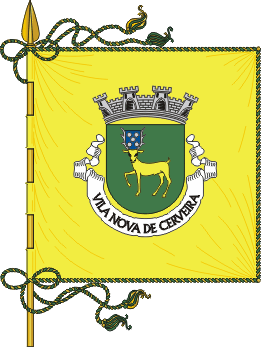
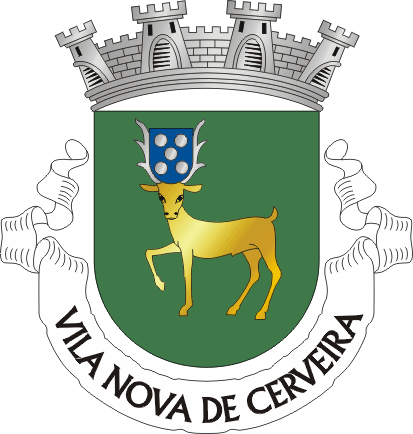
- Flag Coat of arms
- Interactive map of Vila Nova de Cerveira
- Coordinates: 41°58′N 8°41′W
- Country: Portugal
- Region: Norte
- Intermunic. comm.: Alto Minho
- District: Viana do Castelo
- Parishes: 11

Government
  - President: Rui Pedro Teixeira Ferreira da Silva (PS)

Area
  - Total: 108.47 km^{2} (41.88 sq mi)

Population (2021)
  - Total: 8,923
  - Density: 82.26/km^{2} (213.1/sq mi)
- Time zone: UTC+00:00 (WET)
  - Summer (DST): UTC+01:00 (WEST)
- Website: http://www.cm-vncerveira.pt

Vila Nova de Cerveira (Portuguese pronunciation: [ˈvilɐ ˈnɔvɐ ðɨ sɨɾˈvɐjɾɐ]) is a municipality in the district of Viana do Castelo in Portugal. The population in 2021 was 8,923, in an area of 108.47 km^{2}.

The municipal holiday is October 1.

== Parishes ==
Administratively, the municipality is divided into 11 civil parishes (freguesias):

- Campos e Vila Meã
- Candemil e Gondar
- Cornes
- Covas
- Gondarém
- Loivo
- Mentrestido
- Reboreda e Nogueira
- Sapardos
- Sopo
- Vila Nova de Cerveira e Lovelhe

== General information ==
The town was founded by King Dinis of Portugal in 1321 and today is mainly known and visited due to the international biennial of art that takes place in the town since 1978.

=== Location ===
Between the river and the mountain, Vila Nova de Cerveira is located on the left bank of Minho River, which establishes the border with Spain, and is limited to northeast with the municipality of Valença, Paredes de Coura to the east, Ponte de Lima to the south, and Caminha to south-southwest.

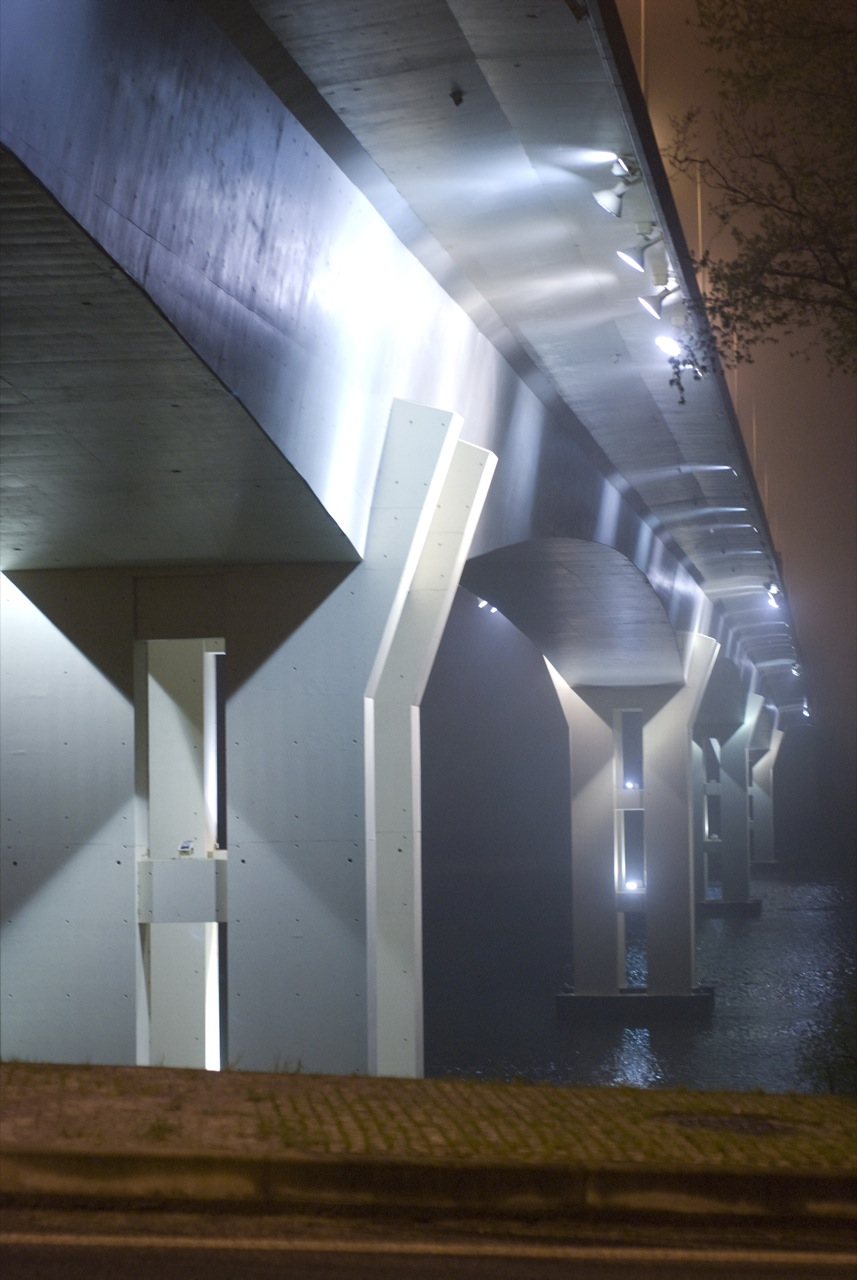
Bridge over the Minho river linking Portugal and Spain

=== The name of the village ===
The name of the village is explained by a legend.

"Once upon a time... there was a stag (deer) that was chosen by the Gods of Olympos to become a King. And so the stag decided to move, together with other stags, to this uninhabited territory that began to be known as "Terras de Cervaria" (Land of the Stags). Many years flew past. Fights, skirmishes, and disasters gradually devastated the colony until only the King Stag was left. According to the legend, when the noblemen from Asturias came down during the Reconquest to conquer what was to become the Condado Portucalense (Portugal), a young noblemen challenged the King Stag to a face-to-face duel. And the old Lord accepted. The duel took place among the trees and weeds on a trenched site. And, so the legend tells, the King Stag swept to victory! He kept the nobleman's flag that turned to be the King's coat of arms. But the Gods deceived the old King. He wouldn't be immortal... Tired of living and ill, the old Lord died in the loneliness of the crags and with him disappeared for good the Terra da Cervaria."

But the legend wasn't forgotten, and the coat of arms still bears a golden passant stag in silver armour standing in a green field.

== History ==
Vila Nova de Cerveira was established by the King Dinis of Portugal on 1 October 1321, who also ordered the construction of Castelo de Vila Nova de Cerveira, the castle that still dominates the town center.

== Attractions ==
- The castle, today transformed to a pousada, was founded by King Dinis of Portugal and dates back from the 14th century. It lies on a small hill that rises next to the Minho River, thus overlooking the town and passages between Vila Nova de Cerveira and Galicia. The castle still preserves the old wall shield as well as some gates. Inside the walls, it is possible to find the old Town Hall, the old Court, the pillory (pelourinho in Portuguese), old barracks, and warehouses.
- The Parish Church, or Igreja Matriz, was built in the 18th century and is dedicated to São Cipriano, the patron Saint of Vila Nova de Cerveira.

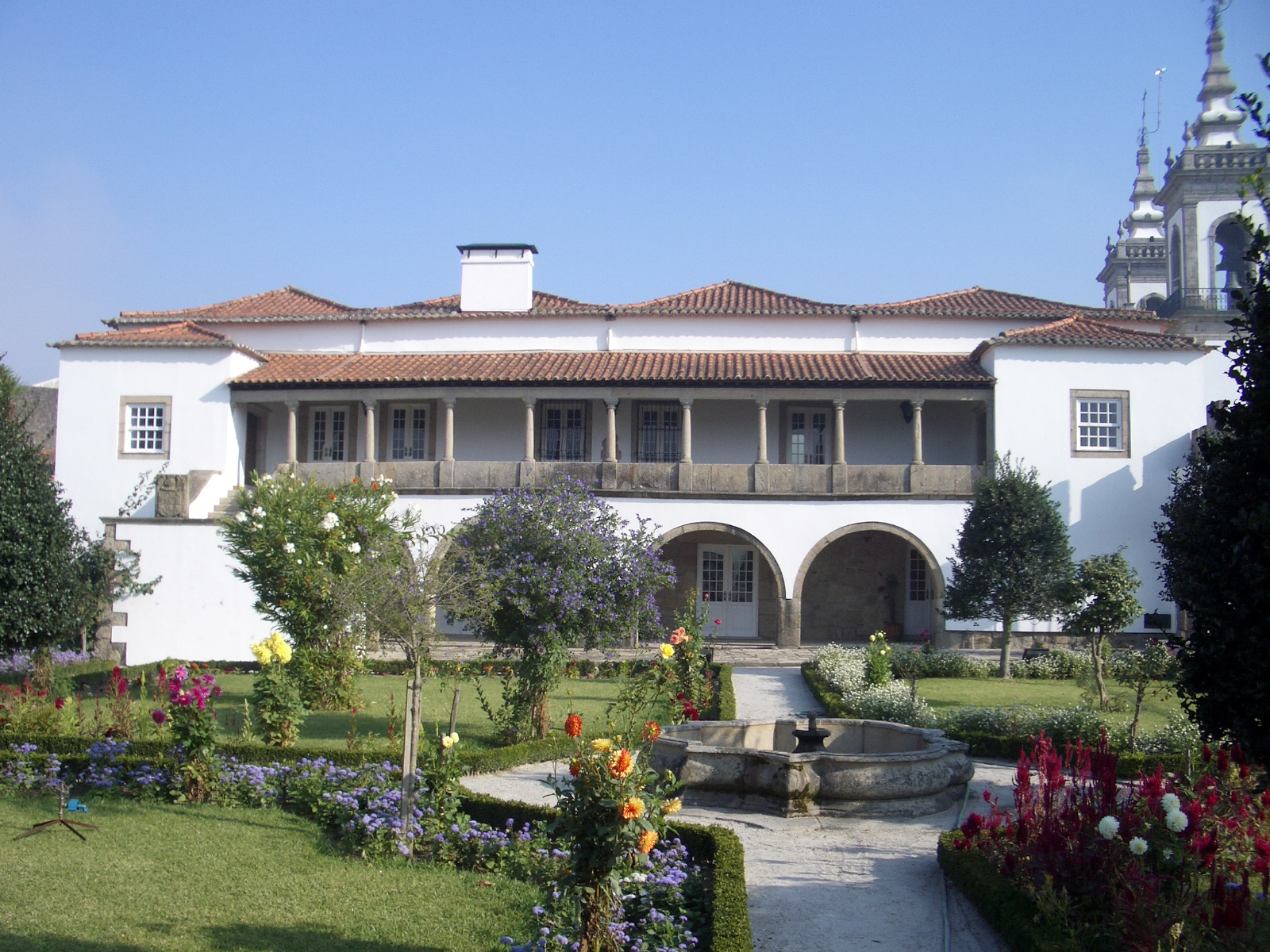
Solar dos Castros

- The pillory, or pelourinho, is a symbol of municipal jurisdiction and is located inside the castle in front of the old Town Hall, or Paços do Concelho. It dates back from the 15th century.
- The old Town Hall dates back from the 16th century and is located inside the castle. In front of the building is the pillory.
- The Misericórdia Church is located inside the castle and dates back from the 17th century.
- The Manor House of the Castros Family, or Solar dos Castros, is a remarkable 18th-century structure, and it is one of the most important buildings in town. Currently, it houses the municipal library.
- Lovelhe Fortress was built in the 17th century in a strategic area for defense manoeuvers on the left bank of Minho River during the restoration war (1640–1668) against Castile

== Notable people ==
- Leonel de Lima (1403-1495) a nobleman, Viscount of Vila Nova de Cerveira.
- Paulo Cabral (born 1972) a former footballer with 238 club caps and one with Portugal
- Ricardo Alves (born 1991) a footballer with over 250 club caps
