= Ínsua Fort =

Fort in Viana do Castelo district, Portugal

- Forte da Ínsua
- Caminha, Viana do Castelo District, Portugal
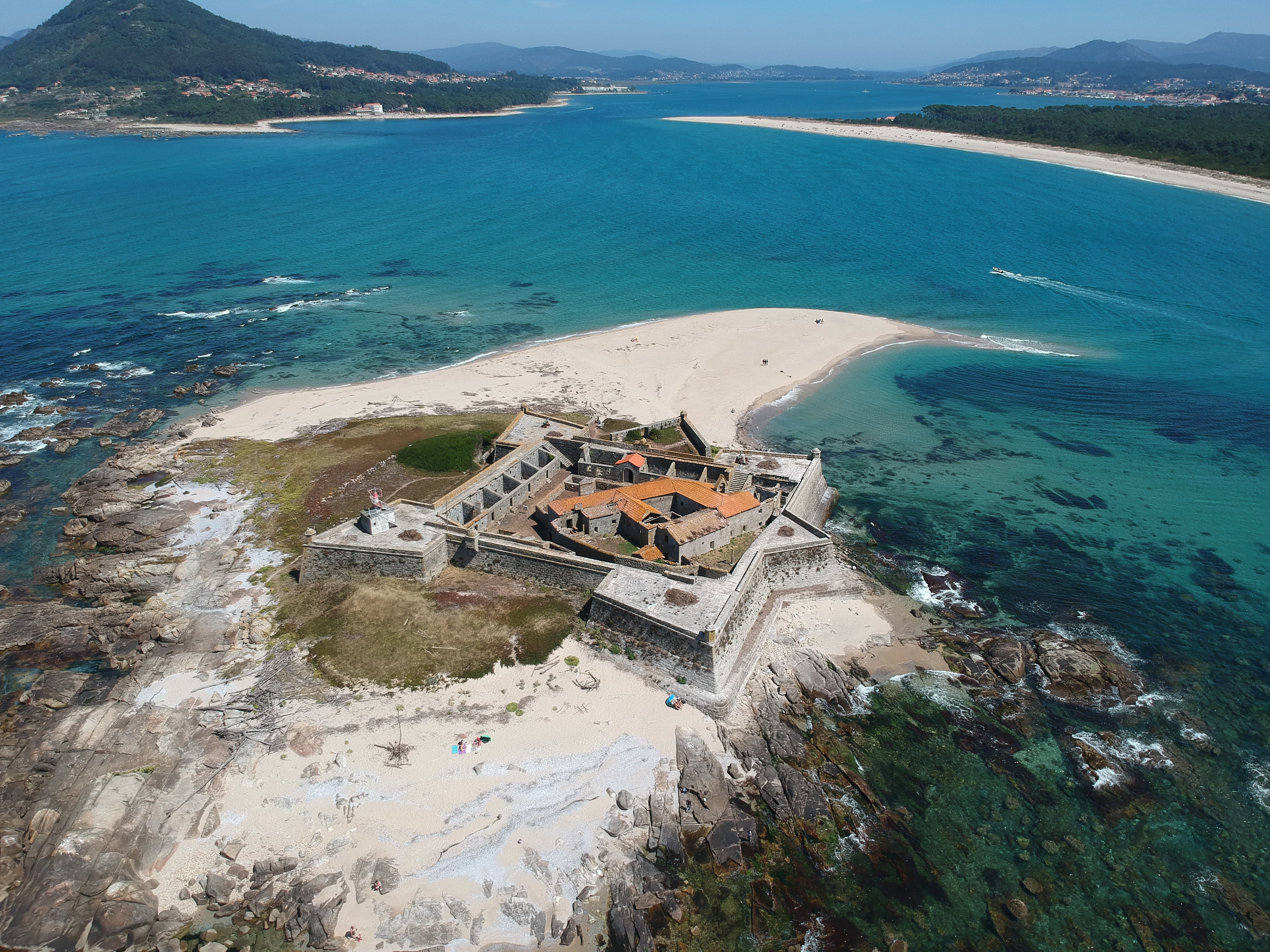

Site information
- Type: Bastion fort

Location
- Coordinates: 41°51′33″N 8°52′28″W

Site history
- Built: 1644 and 1652
- In use: 17th-20th century.
- Events: Restoration War, Peninsular War; Liberal Wars

The Fort Nossa Senhora da Ínsua, also known as Ínsua Fort, is located on Ínsua de Santo Isidro, in the parish of União das Freguesias de Moledo e Cristelo, in the municipality of Caminha, in the Viana do Castelo district, in Portugal.

It has been listed as a National Monument since 1910. It is one of only two forts in Portugal that combine a monastery with a modern bastion fortress, the other being the Berlengas Fort.

== History ==
The small island on which it stands, about two hundred meters from the coast, south of the mouth of the river Minho, was originally used as a place of worship. A small chapel was built in it under the invocation of Our Lady of Ínsua.

== The early stronghold ==
In 1392, Franciscan friars from Galicia, under the direction of Friar Diogo Arias, built a monastery on the island. The first fortification on the site dates from this period, meant to protect the river mouth and the religious congregation from pirates, built by order of King John I.

In 1471 the monastery underwent renovation works, with new cells being added and improvements made to its chapel.

Later, Manuel I of Portugal (1495-1521), on a pilgrimage to Santiago (1502), determined that new renovation works be undertaken, finished in 1512. Likewise, King Philip I of Portugal (1580-1598) promoted new renovations, which adapted it to the use of artillery, an imperative need to face the attacks from English and French privateers. None of these structures have survived.

=== The 18th century fort ===
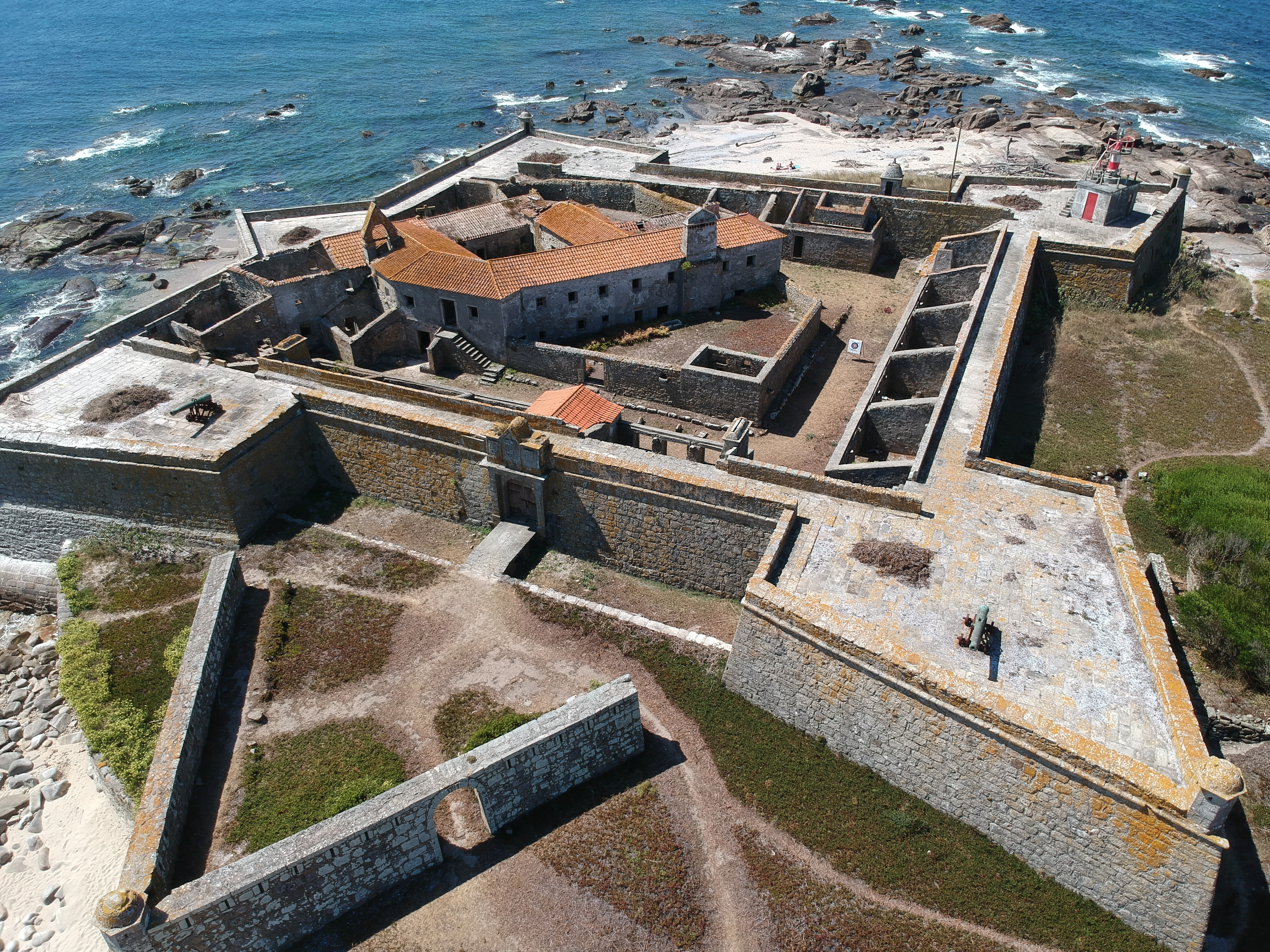
Aerial close-up of the fort

The current structure dates from the War of Restoration (1640-1668). It was built between 1644 and 1652 by the orders of the then Governor of Arms of Minho, Dom Diogo de Lima Nogueira, during the reign of John IV of Portugal (1640-1656).

The dependencies of the monastery and the fort were repaired several times during the 18th century, notably in 1717 after King John V donated 200$000 reis to repair the church, its vaulted ceiling and, in 1767, the construction of new cells, the chapter room and altarpiece. Between 1793 and 1795, the friars left the convent so the renovation works could be concluded. In the same period, in 1765, the fortification was garrisoned by 10 men, and seven bronze cannon.

During the Peninsular War, Ínsua was occupied by Spanish and French troops. Later, with the extinction of the religious orders (1834), the fort was abandoned by the religious community, being garrisoned exclusively by the Portuguese Army. The last governor of the base was appointed in 1909, Major Rodolfo José Gonçalves.

It was classified as a National Monument by the Decree of June 16, 1910, published in June 23 of the year.

In 1940, it passed from the Ministry of the Navy to the responsibility of the Ministry of Finance.

From 1954 to 1957, the complex underwent conservation works, followed by other campaigns from 1967 to 1975, 1984 to 1986 and from 1998 to 2001.

In 1990, there was a project by the Polytechnic Institute of Viana do Castelo for the installation of an Advanced Research Center in the marine areas of the coast and River Minho.

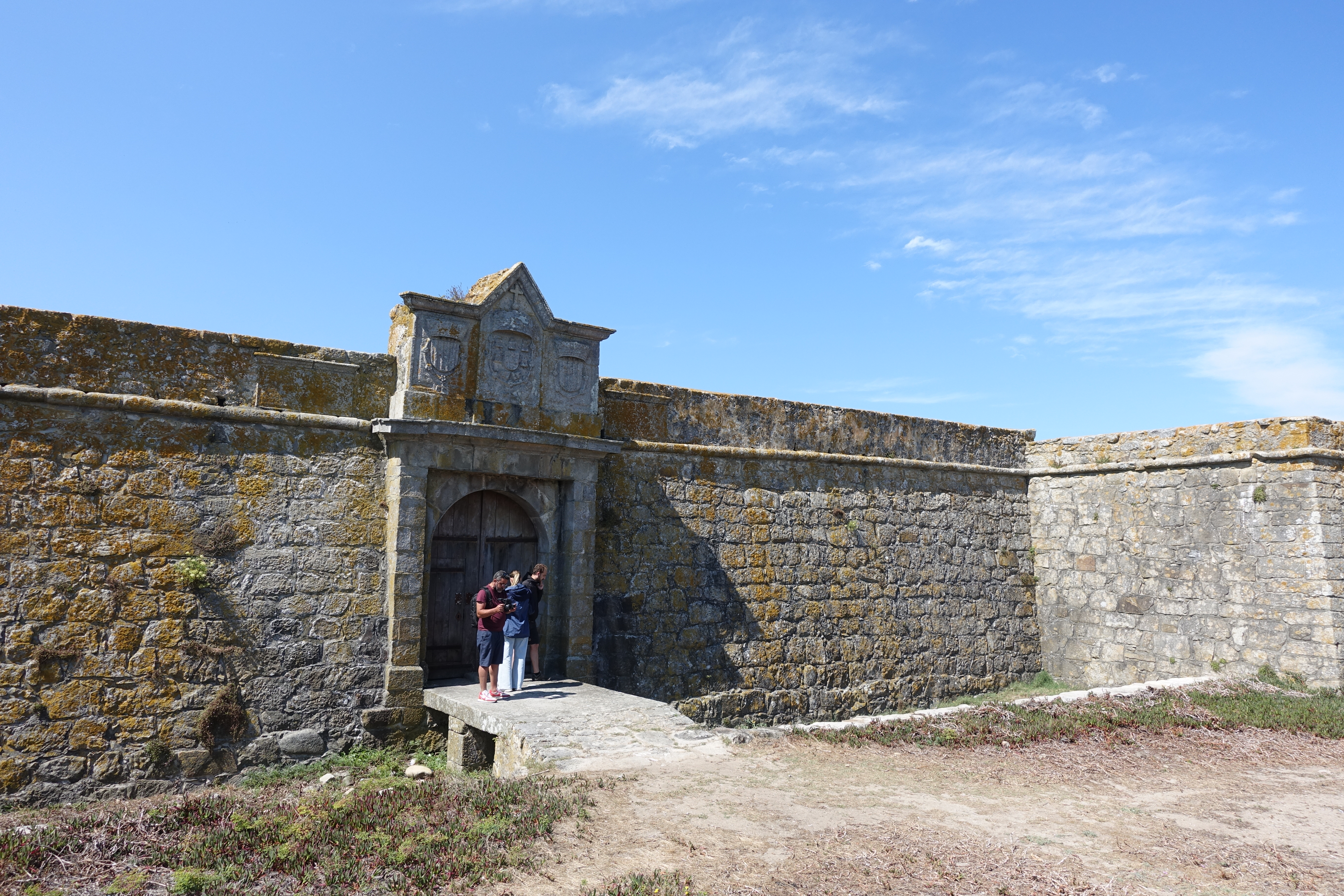
Fort gate

== Programa Revive ==
In 2016, the fort was part of the Programa Revive, a project of the Portuguese state, that provides for the opening of heritage to private investment for the development of tourism. The legal model is that of concession.

The property was conceded in 2020 to the company DiverLanhoso Lda.

== Features ==
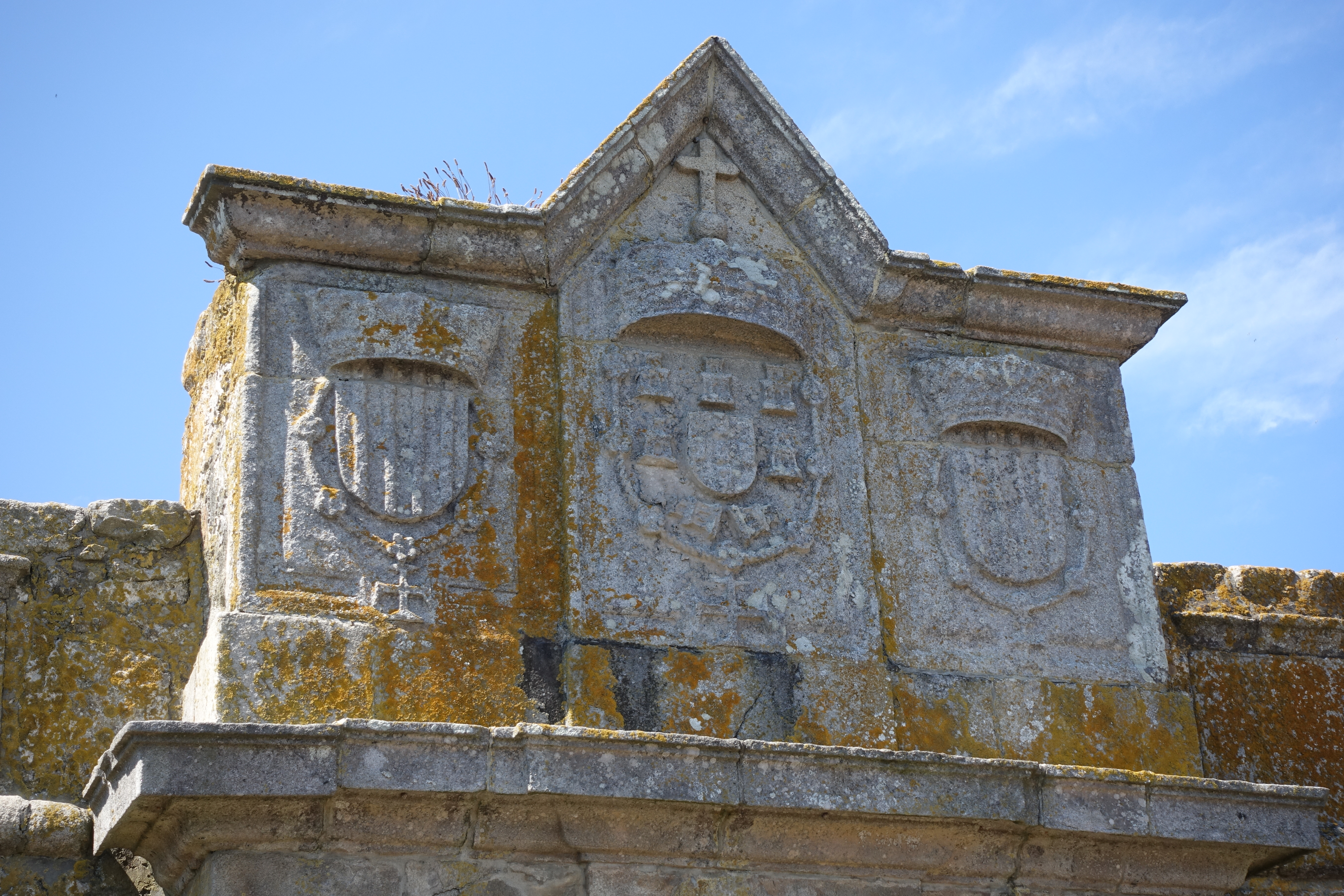
Stone-of-arms above the gate

A coastal bastion fort, it has an irregular star-shaped plan, with five bastions and a ravelin, with a monastery inside, expanded in 1676. A rectangular balcony over corbels, with a similar cover. The gate is inserted in an arch in a rectangular relief, on which a triangular pediment rests, whose tympanum is decorated by three coats of arms, those of Portugal and the governors. A ravelin protects the gate. On the right, a stone with an inscription alluding to the construction of the fort was incorporated:

"The Piety of the Very High and Powerful Monarch King D. João IV / administered through the intervention and assistance of D. Diogo de Lima / Nogueira General and Viscount of Vila Nova da Cerveira Governor of / Arms and Army of the Province of Entre Douro e Minho dedicated / this fortification to the most serene Queen of the Angels Our Lady / of Ínsua for the asylum and defense of the clergymen of the First Rule / Seraphic who assist in the continuous joys of this lady under / under whose patronage this court is assured. in the era of 1650"

The stronghold is divided into two areas: The first corresponds to a wide paved platform, where the barracks, storage and kitchen were built. In the remaining space, the convent was incorporated, with a sober and austere structure, with a floor model, whose set is formed by the church, with a longitudinal plan composed of a single nave covered by a barrel vault and sacristy, and by the cloister, with a quadrangular plan, with wings composed of Ionic colonnades.

The well located on the island is one of only three in the world that draws freshwater despite being located in the middle of the sea.
