= Castle of Vila Nova de Cerveira =

Medieval castle in Viana do Castelo, Portugal

- Castelo de Vila Nova de Cerveira
- Viana do Castelo, Minho-Lima, Norte in Portugal
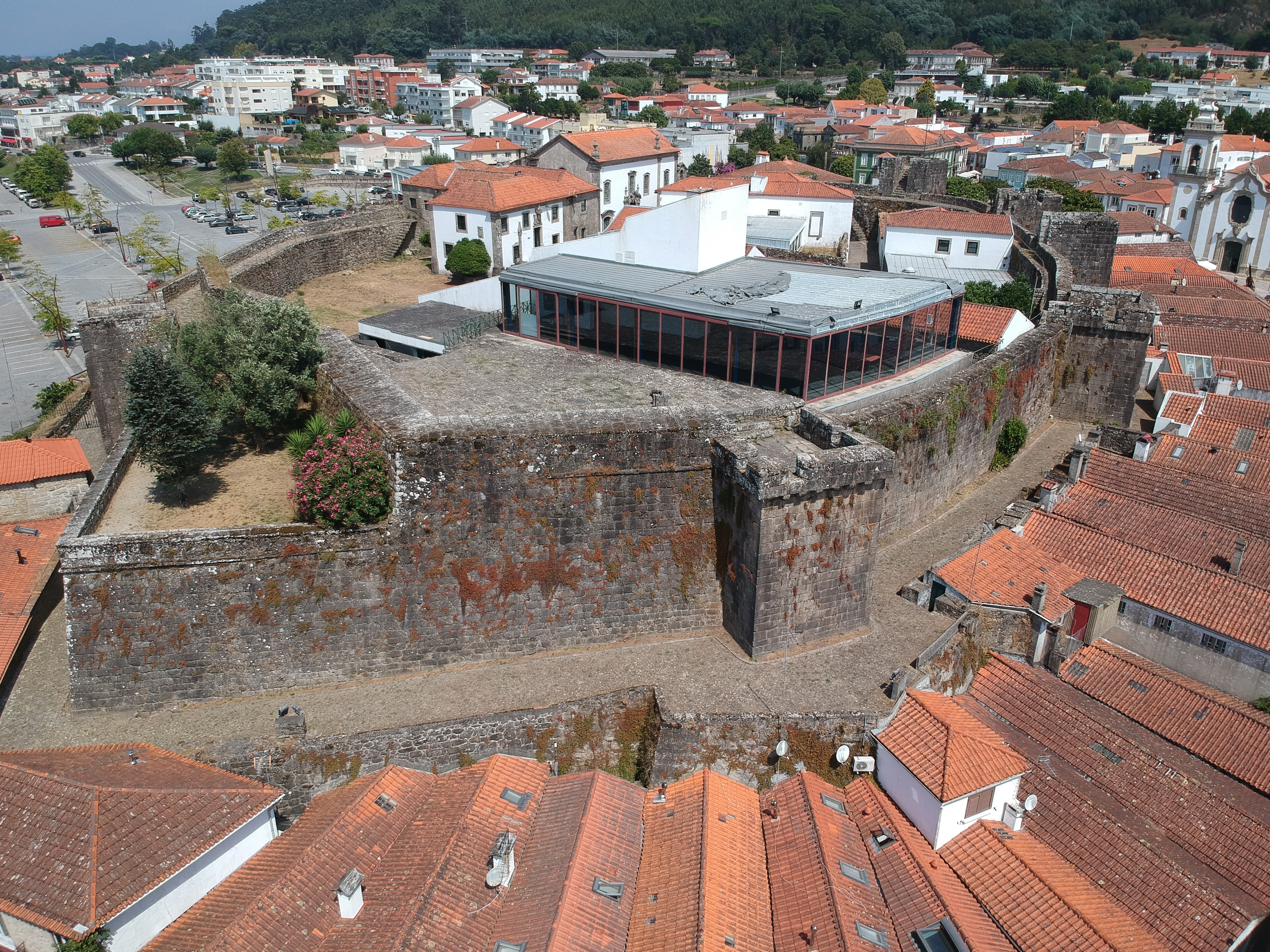

Site information
- Type: Castle
- Owner: Portuguese Republic
- Open to the public: Public

Location
- Coordinates: 41°56′25.8″N 8°44′41.8″W

Site history
- Built: 13th century
- Materials: Mixed masonry, Quadratum, Vittatum, Mixtum, Granite

The Castle of Vila Nova de Cerveira (Portuguese: Castelo de Vila Nova de Cerveira) is a medieval castle located in the civil parish of Vila Nova de Cerveira e Lovelhe, in the municipality of Vila Nova de Cerveira, Portuguese Viana do Castelo.

== History ==
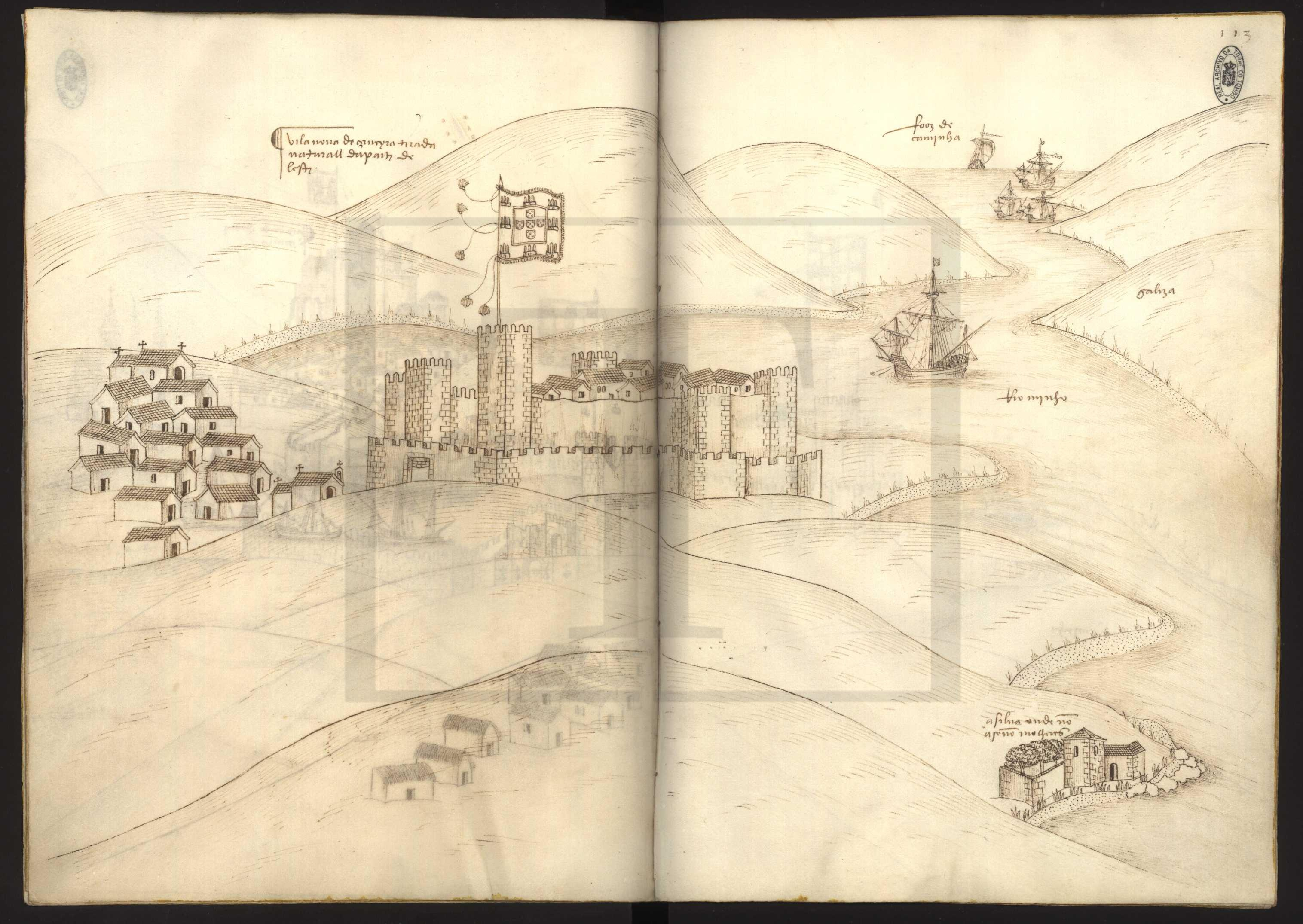
The Castle of Cerveira as seen in the Livro das Fortelezas (1509/1510) of Duarte d'Armas

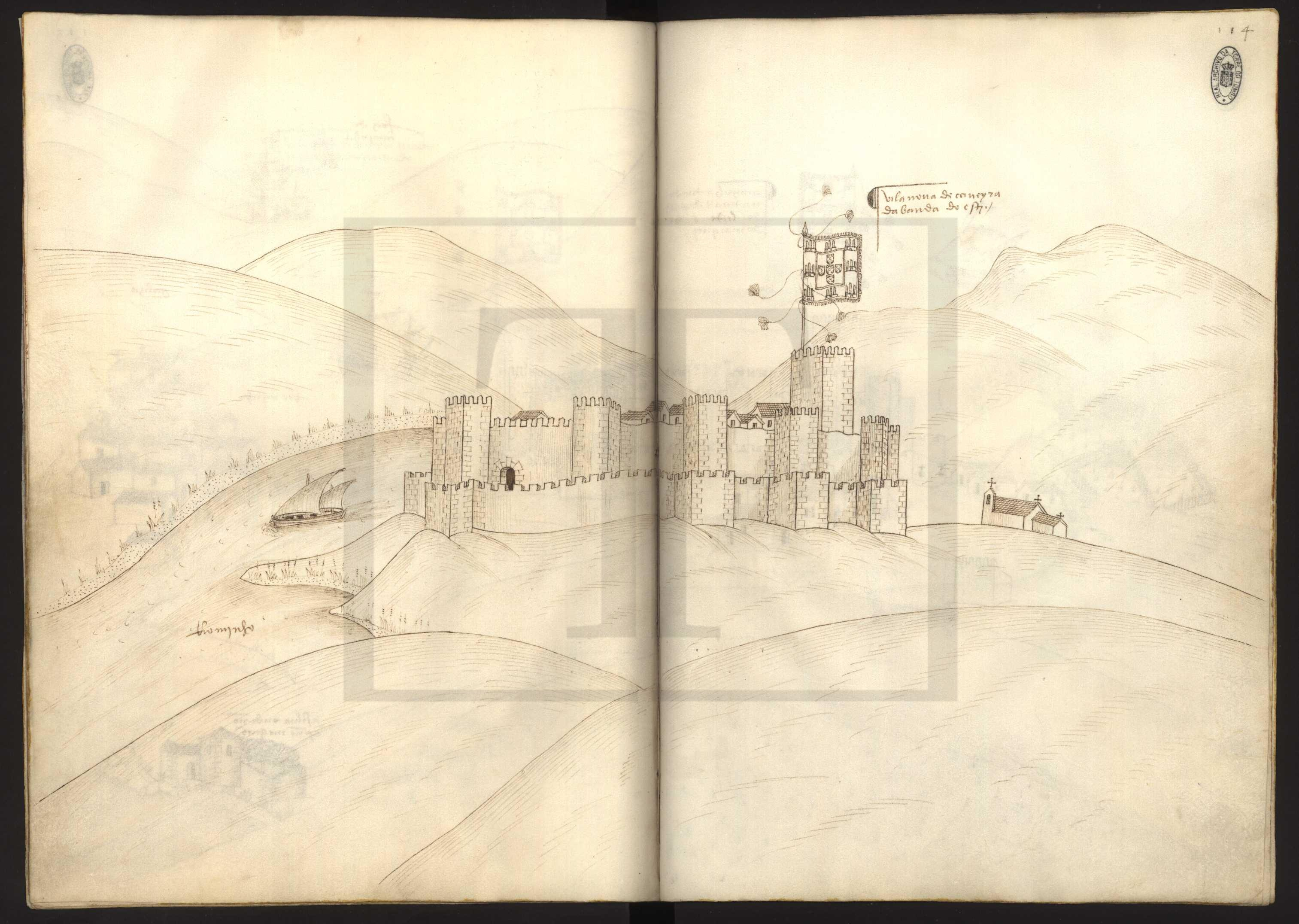
Another view of the Castle from the Livro das Fortelezas

In the 13th century, the castle was included as part of the nuptial dowry of D. Mécia, wife of King D. Sancho II. It was also referred to in 1229 in a document referencing the village of Elvas, naming the nobles who signed the charter; Pedro Novães, the tenens of the castle of Cerveira was identified, suggesting that the castle was merely a defensive tower.

During the 1258 Inquirições (Inquiries) noted the obligations of the residents of Cerveira and its surrounding parishes. Carlos Alberto Ferreira de Almeida indicated that the castle of Cerveira, was already known in the 13th century as the vila nova (new town), owing to the original Cerveira being situated in the mountains (possibly over the hilltop of Espírito Santo, in Penafiel, parish of Roboreda), or in Cornes.

In 1320, King D. Dinis ordered that the settlement be colonized. To this end, the King issued a foral (charter), with one-third of the supported payments be used for the conservation of the castle. The courtyard, limited by the walls was too small for the 100 homes that King D. Dinis expected to settlement the village; ultimately, he accepted the construction of a settlement that was constructed outside the walls. The design if Duarte d'Armas, in his Livro das Fortalezas, indicates that at the beginning of the 16th century, the barrio outside the walls was more complete then those in the interior, including two religious buildings.

Following the outbreak of the Portuguese succession crisis, the castle alcalde and village remained loyal to Castile. In the spring of 1385, the Constable Nuno Alvares Pereira, after conquering the Castle of Neiva began a pilgrimage to Santiago de Compostela and stopped to rest in Vila Nova de Cerveira for the night.

Between the 14th and 15th century, the barbican was constructed under the reigns of King D. Fernando or King D. João I. King D. Afonso V (1438–1481) rewarded the exploits of D. Leonel de Lima, during the north Africa campaign by bestowing on him the title of 1st Viscount of Vila Nova de Cerveira (1476), and giving his possession of the lands of the village. Their successor, King D. Manuel reissued the orders to renovate the castle.

The construction of the 16th century fortress, resulted from the fear of Spanish threats from across the border during the Restoration Wars, and was included in a line of defenses along the Minho River and Atlantic coast. On 25 September 1643, forces of Cerveira resisted attacks by troops loyal to King Philip IV of Spain, with the regions defenses organized by Governor Manuel de Lima e Abreu. Following these events, in 1650, the chapel of Nossa Senhora da Ajuda was constructed over the barbican. With the continued need to defend the territory, the 7th Viscount of Vila Nova de Cerveira ordered that the settlement be circled with walls, bartizans and four interior bastions (São Miguel, Espírito Santo, Conceição and Almas). In addition a half bastian and three smaller redoubts were established along the river. The courtyard had three gates: the Campanha Gate, the Church Gate, Nova Gate and Rio Gate. These public works were complete in 1667, under the direction of Field Marshall Francisco Azevedo, supported with the royal taxation on water and fife from the settlers.

In 1718, Manuel Pinto Vilalobos measured and evaluated the lands in the interior of the fortification, for the purpose of sale in public competition.

But, by 1742, the batteries received a new piece, in order to dominate the Fort of S. Lourenço de Gaião.

In 1809, with the defense organized by the aged Colonel Gonçalo Coelho de Araújo (he was 77 years old at the time), the military square resisted Napoleon's Second Invasion during the Second Invasion Peninsular Wars, under the command of Nicolau Jean de Dieu Soult. They were successful in impeding their crossing the river.

The growth in the local economy and need to support the growing population meant that the keep tower was demolished in 1844, and the following year the Afonsino tower, were partially destroyed to build other structures. Between 1845 and 1846, the wall's gates began to slowly be destroyed. With this slow deterioration, the castle slowly lost its importance, resulting in the 1875 authorization to demolish the fortress. The earliest attempt to recover importance of the castle began in 1905, with work done to repair wall cracks.

The DGEMN Direcção Geral dos Edifícios e Monumentos Nacionais (Directorate General for Buildings and National Monuments) began work in 1969 on consolidating and treating the diverse walls, and work was planned in 1977 to continue the consolidation. But, between 1977 and 1982, the fortifications and buildings were adapted for the establishment of the hostel. On 6 September 1982, the Pousada de D. Dinis was inaugurated within the interior of the medieval castle. There were a series of projects to benefit these changes on the site, including repaving the battlements, installation of new kitchens, bar and laundry. A project to partially adapt the first and second residences for the installation of a central phone centre. Work continued to recuperate the ceilings and exterior landscaping, alter the laundry ventilation and roadways between 1982 and 1985.

Archaeological excavations along the Rua Costa Brava along the medieval castle walls were undertaken in 2002.

In 2004, the castle was approved for the Plano Director das Fortalezas transfronteiriças do Vale do Minho (Minho Valley Transborder Fortress Directors Plan), under the Interreg III Program, which sought to inventory the built inventory, evaluate their state of conservation and determine strategies for preservation. The intent of the plan was to valorize, promote and determine the fort spaces in order to promote a cultural and tourist program for the margins of the Minho River.

On 22 September 2006, a public presentation of the Plano de Pormenor de Salvaguarda do Centro Histórico (Detail Plan for Safeguarding the Historic Centre), coordinated by members of the municipal council, architect Sandro Lopes and archaeologist Paula Ramalho.

== Architecture ==
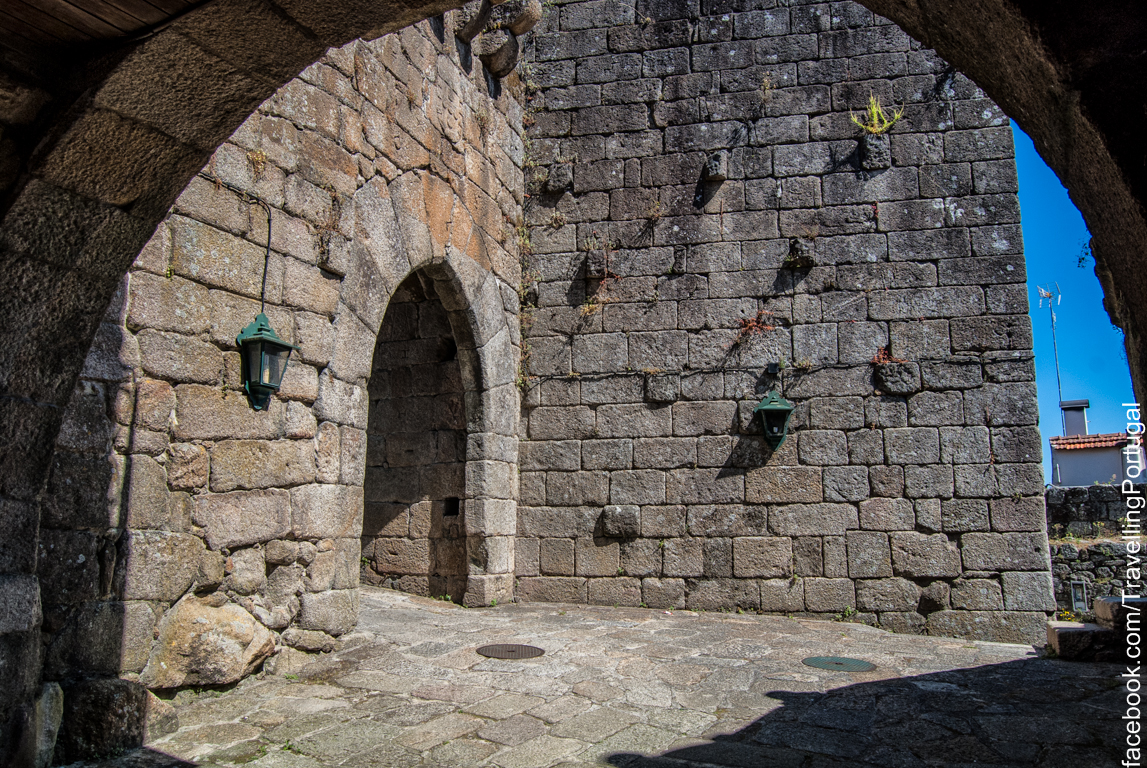
The stone gates of the castle

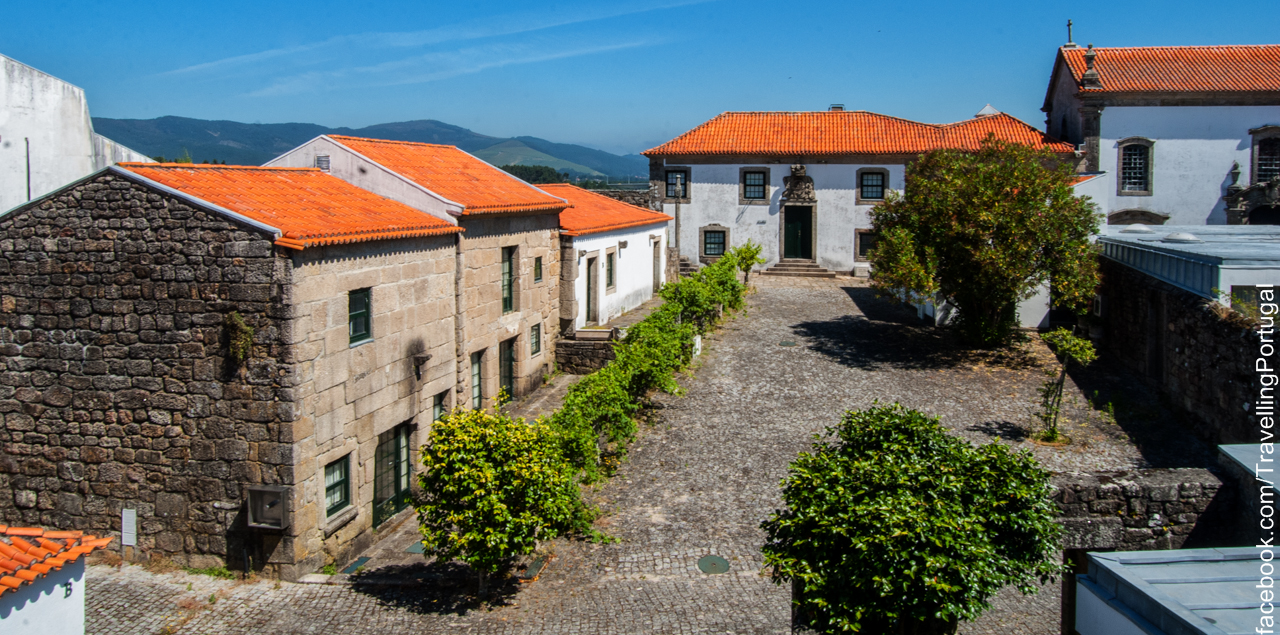
A view of the former municipal seat within the walls of the castle

The castle is situated in an urban context, addorsed and distinct on the right bank of the Minho River, over a small portion of the wall, that extends along the border of the city. Its interiors are occupied by constructions adapted for their use as hostel, including its restaurant which is distinctly different to the surrounding classified structure.

The castle has an oval plan, formed with 8 rectangular towers and a line of walls, and integrated into the São Miguel bastion over the river and barbican oriented towards the town. Access to the rounded, barbican gate includes access to the rectangular body integrated with the chapel of Nossa Senhora da Ajuda. Below this space is the wall, creating an elbow. The frontispiece of the chapel has granite cornerstone, with rectangular pediment and a second floor doorway with interrupted frontispiece and veranda.

The barbican continues towards the east, with circling walls and angular extensions, then tower followed by visible wall. Entrance to the castle occurs a double gate: a wall between the Chapel of Nossa Senhora da Ajuda and tower, surmounted by coat-of-arms and sections of a former balcony; the second is above the tower, through a double vain, surmounted by the coat-of-arms of Portugal. Between this tower and the Church of the Misericórdia is a latrine encircled by two cantilevers.

The interior courtyard is encircled by battlements accessed by stone staircases. The visible towers, some with, others without crowns are of different heights, with protruding parapets to the west. The bastion, framed with exterior stone, is accessible by a small "traitors" gate alongside a cistern. Among many of the buildings constructed inside the walls are the old residence of the governor, municipal seat, pillory, jail, barracks and storerooms, along with the Church of the Misericórida.
