= 1961–62 S.L. Benfica season =

Benfica
1961–62 season
- President: Maurício Vieira de Brito (until 31 March 1962); António Fezas Vital
- Head coach: Béla Guttmann
- Stadium: Estádio da Luz
- Primeira Divisão: 3rd
- Taça de Portugal: Winners
- European Cup: Winners
- Intercontinental Cup: Runners-up
- Top goalscorer: League: José Águas (18); All: Eusébio (29)
- Biggest win: Benfica 11–0 Caldas (31 December 1961)
- Biggest defeat: Peñarol 5–0 Benfica (17 September 1961)
Home colours	Away colours

The 1961–62 season was Sport Lisboa e Benfica's 58th season in existence and the club's 28th consecutive season in the top flight of Portuguese football, covering the period from 1 August 1961 to 31 July 1962. Benfica competed domestically in the Primeira Divisão and Taça de Portugal, and participated in the European Cup after winning the competition in the previous season. As the reigning European Cup holders, they represented the continent in the Intercontinental Cup.

In the third year of Béla Guttmann's stint, Benfica had a slow transfer market, only noted addition was António Simões. The season did not start in the best of ways, with the team losing the Intercontinental Cup and suffering a blip in performance that saw him trail leaders by five points before December. However, the performance in Europe remained unchanged and Benfica progressed to the quarter-finals after beating Austria Wien. The domestic performance remained disappointing in January and February, while in Europe, Benfica lost 3–1 to Nürnberg. A strong second leg put them in the semi-finals, where they met Tottenham Hotspur. A 3–1 win in Lisbon was followed by a 2–1 loss in London, meaning had qualified for their second consecutive European Cup final. They would face Real Madrid on 2 May 1962. In an entertaining game, Benfica trailed twice, but managed to overcame Madrid in the second half for 5–3 win, retaining the European Cup. They concluded the season with their 11th Taça de Portugal win.

== Season summary ==
After a highly successful season, where Benfica won their first European Cup and added the league title, Béla Guttmann remained for a third year, with an increased salary. The club released several players but only signed one; instead they promoted António Simões from the youth team. The pre-season began on 25 August and their first game was on the 28th. They met Atlético CP and Sporting CP in Taça Angola: two short matches in the same day in festival to celebrate Angola. They faced the same teams in the Taça de Honra, finishing runners-up to Sporting. Official competition began on 4 September with the first leg of the Intercontinental Cup with Peñarol. A one-nil win in Lisbon followed a 5–0 loss in Montevideo. In the replay, Penãrol won 2–1 and took the Intercontinental Cup.

Domestically, Benfica started their title defence with two wins, but four winless matches, which included a loss in Coimbra, caused Benfica to fell to sixth place, three points shy of leaders Sporting. However, in the European Cup, Benfica had no problem beating Austria Wien in the first round. In December, the gap to Sporting increased to five points after a 2–1 defeat in the Clássico. The same month, Eusébio had the first of several left knee operations. In the opening month of 1962, Benfica drew to Sporting in the Lisbon derby; a result that best served Sporting's interest, who kept a four-point lead. In February, Eusébio returned to action on the 12th, while his teammates were defeated in the snow of Nuremberg, on the first leg of the quarter-finals. Nürnberg won 3–1 with the help of Costa Pereira, who had a poor performance. Before the second leg of the European tie, Benfica lost to Sporting da Covilhã, complicating their hopes of renewing the league title. They recovered from their domestic disarray and thrashed Nürnberg by 6–0, qualifying for the semi-finals.

The following month, Benfica lost more points in the league, with Belenenses, practically ending any chance of retaining the Primeira Divisão badge. Nonetheless, in Europe, the situation was much better, with the team beating Tottenham Hotspur by 3–1 in Lisbon, which gave them a precious advantage to London. On the 5 April, Benfica lost 2–1 on the White Hart Lane, home of Tottenham, but they still qualified for their second consecutive European Cup final on a 4–3 aggregate win. Later in the month, they defeated Porto in the third round of the Portuguese Cup.

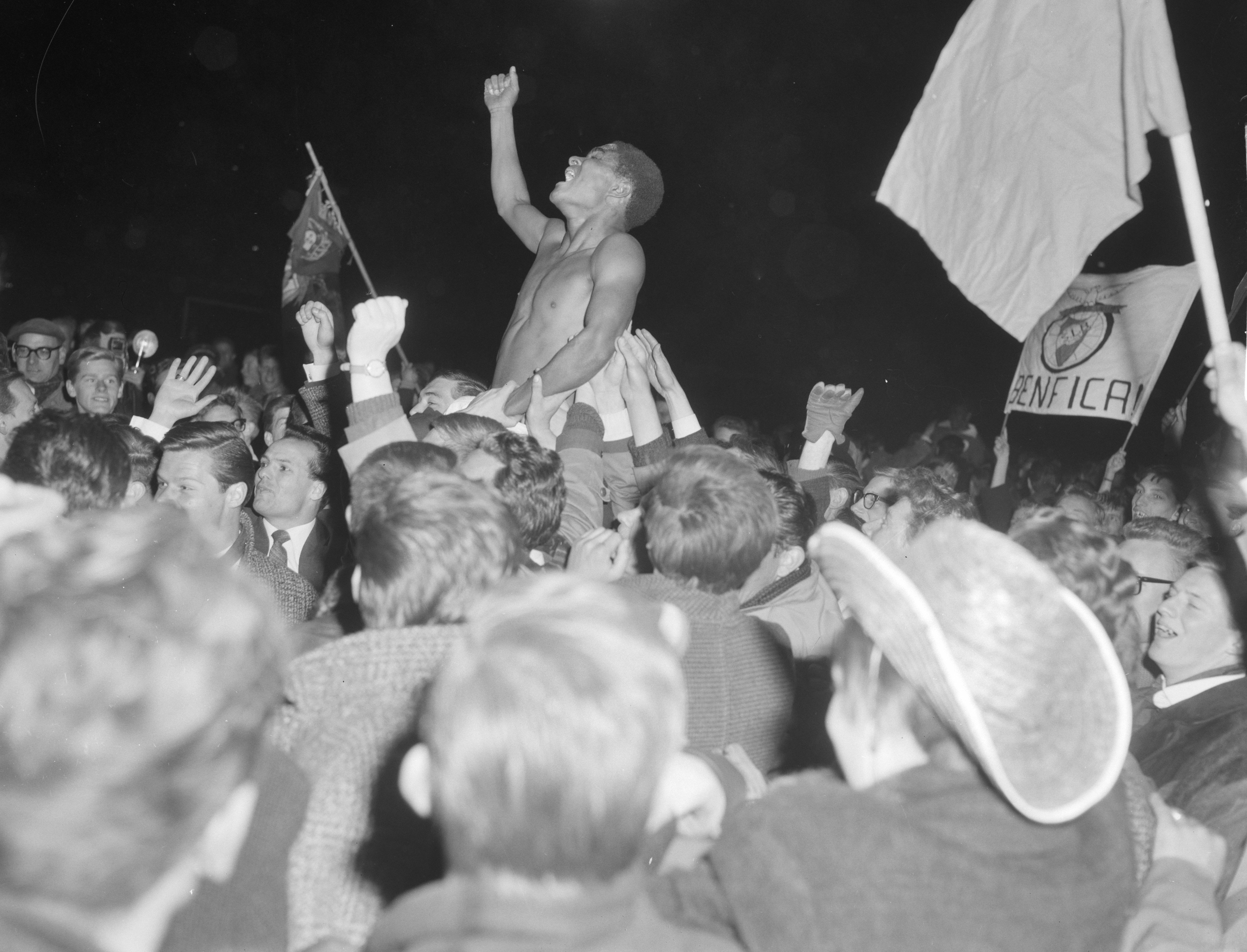
Eusébio celebrating Benfica's 1962 European Cup victory

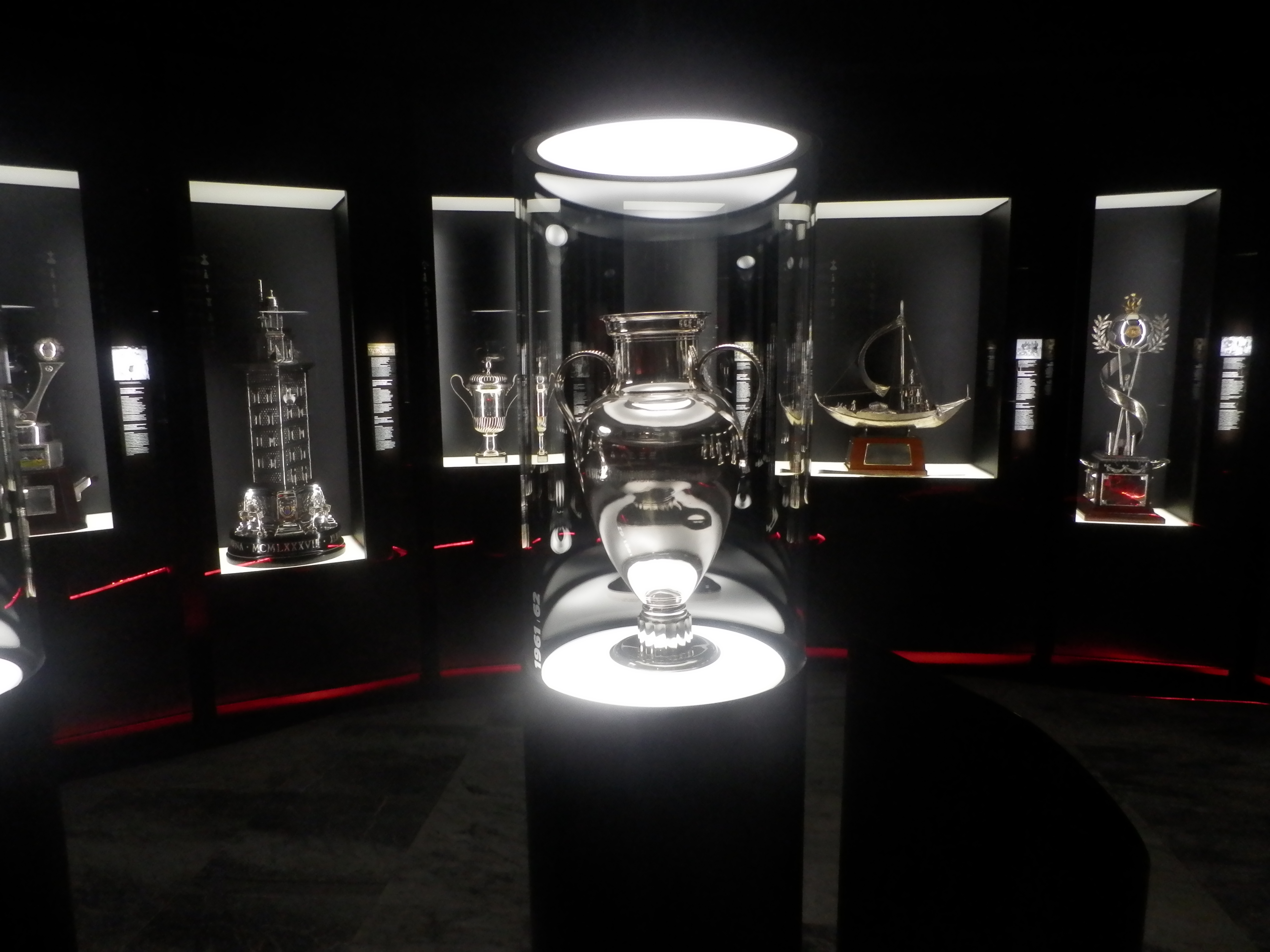
The 1962 European Cup trophy on display at Museu Cosme Damião

On 2 May, Benfica met Real Madrid in Amsterdam. The Spaniards were the overwhelming favourites, with players such as Alfredo Di Stéfano, Ferenc Puskás and Francisco Gento. Madrid started better and, by the 23rd minute, Puskás had scored a double. Águas brought it down to 2–1 on the 25th minute after he deflected a powerful shot from Eusébio. Less than 10 minutes later, Eusébio again cushioned a cross to Cavém who fired into the net. Madrid reacted with another goal from Puskás putting the score at 2–3 at half-time. Five minutes into the second half, Coluna levelled the game again with a strong shot from outside the lines. On the 64th minute, Eusébio was brought down by Pachín inside the box, with the referee signalling a penalty that Eusébio himself converted. Five minutes later, in a free-kick after a mistake by José Santamaría, Coluna served Eusébio, who blasted another goal, the 5–3. Benfica had successfully retained the European Cup. May closed with another Lisbon derby, with Benfica losing and handing over the title to Sporting. In early June, Benfica embarked on a tour through the Mediterranean and closed the season with the semi-finals and final of the Taça de Portugal. On 1 July 1962, Benfica won their 11th Portuguese Cup, with a double from Eusébio and another from Cavém. Guttmann meanwhile, despite winning eight times the amount of money his players received, resigned, saying "the third year is almost deadly for a manager".

== Competitions ==
Win Draw Loss Postponed

=== Overall record ===
Competition	First match	Last match	Record								
Competition	First match	Last match	G	W	D	L	GF	GA	GD	Win %	Source
Primeira Divisão	24 September 1961	27 May 1962	26	14	8	4	69	38	+31	53.85	
Taça de Portugal	26 November 1961	1 July 1962	12	9	2	1	52	14	+38	75.00	
European Cup	31 October 1961	2 May 1962	7	4	1	2	22	11	+11	57.14	
Intercontinental Cup	4 September 1961	19 September 1961	3	1	0	2	2	7	−5	33.33	
Total			48	28	11	9	145	70	+75	58.33	

=== Primeira Divisão ===
==== League table ====
Pos	Team	Pld	W	D	L	GF	GA	GD	Pts	Qualification or relegation
1	Sporting CP (C)	26	19	5	2	66	17	+49	43	Qualified for the European Cup
2	Porto	26	18	5	3	57	16	+41	41	Invited for the Inter-Cities Fairs Cup
3	Benfica (Note: Benfica qualified directly to the first round as title holders.)	26	14	8	4	69	38	+31	36	Qualified for the European Cup
4	CUF Barreiro	26	14	5	7	44	34	+10	33	
5	Belenenses	26	12	7	7	51	35	+16	31	Invited for the Inter-Cities Fairs Cup

Source: RSSSF
(C) Champions

==== Results by round ====
Round	1	2	3	4	5	6	7	8	9	10	11	12	13	14	15	16	17	18	19	20	21	22	23	24	25	26
Ground	A	H	A	H	A	H	H	A	H	A	H	A	H	H	A	H	A	H	A	A	H	A	H	A	H	A
Result	W	W	D	D	L	D	W	L	W	W	W	W	D	W	W	W	L	W	D	W	D	W	D	D	W	L
Position	3	1	1	2	5	5	2	4	4	3	3	3	3	3	3	3	3	3	3	3	3	3	3	3	3	3

Source: ForaDeJogo
A = Away; H = Home; W = Win; D = Draw; L = Loss

==== Matches ====
24 September 1961 1	Leixões	1–2	Benfica	Matosinhos
16:00	Osvaldo Silva 64' (pen.)		17', 82' Eusébio	Stadium: Estádio do Mar; Referee: Edmundo Carvalho

1 October 1961 2	Benfica	8–1	Salgueiros	Lisbon
15:00	Eusébio 10', 13', 23', 39'; José Águas 26', 33', 50'; José Augusto 49'		30' Lela	Stadium: Estádio da Luz; Referee: Manuel Barulho

15 October 1961 3	Olhanense	1–1	Benfica	Olhão
15:00	Armando 76'		30' (pen.) Eusébio	Stadium: Estádio José Arcanjo; Referee: Encarnação Salgado

29 October 1961 4	Benfica	1–1	Sporting da Covilhã	Lisbon
15:00	Bento Couceiro 1' (o.g.)		9' Adventino Pedro	Stadium: Estádio da Luz; Referee: Samuel Abreu

5 November 1961 5	Académica de Coimbra	3–1	Benfica	Coimbra
17:00	Francisco Abreu 32'; Gaio 50', 80'		20' Coluna	Stadium: Estádio Municipal de Coimbra; Referee: Porfírio da Silva

12 November 1961 6	Benfica	0–0	Belenenses	Lisbon
15:00				Stadium: Estádio da Luz; Referee: Rogério de Melo Paiva

19 November 1961 7	Benfica	3–1	Lusitano de Èvora	Lisbon
16:00	Coluna 8', 43'; José Águas 14'		25' Walter Carvalho	Stadium: Estádio da Luz; Referee: Marcos Lobato

3 December 1961 8	Porto	2–1	Benfica	Porto
16:00	Veríssimo 10'; Jaime 77'		5' José Águas	Stadium: Estádio das Antas; Referee: Renato Santos

10 December 1961 9	Benfica	2–1	Atlético	Lisbon
16:00	José Augusto 37', 67'		8' Moreira	Stadium: Estádio da Luz; Referee: Evaristo Silva

16 December 1961 10	CUF	1–3	Benfica	Barreiro
16:00	Vieira Dias 18'		43' Coluna; 68' Santana; 83' José Torres	Stadium: Complexo Desportivo Alfredo da Silva; Referee: Reinaldo Silva

24 December 1961 11	Benfica	1–0	Vitória de Guimarães	Lisbon
16:00	Coluna 4'			Stadium: Estádio da Luz; Referee: Marcos Lobato

7 January 1962 12	Beira-Mar	2–3	Benfica	Aveiro
16:00	Diego 2'; Hóracio Garcia 9'		8' Germano; 23' José Águas; 29' Cavém	Stadium: Estádio Mário Duarte; Referee: João Pinto Ferreira

14 January 1962 13	Benfica	3–3	Sporting	Lisbon
15:00	Santana 2'; Germano 75' (pen.); José Augusto 81'		1' Diego Arizaga; 11' Géo Carvalho; 46' Hugo Sarmento	Stadium: Estádio da Luz; Referee: Salvador Garcia

25 January 1962 14	Benfica	7–1	Leixões	Lisbon
16:00	José Augusto 16', 27', 66', 78'; Santana 58', 71'; José Águas 75'		60' (o.g.) Costa Pereira	Stadium: Estádio da Luz; Referee: Encarnação Salgado

4 February 1962 15	Salgueiros	4–5	Benfica	Porto
15:00	Cavém 39' (o.g.); Dário 51'; Lela 53'; Benje 90'		27', 58' Santana; 66' José Augusto; 70', 87' José Águas	Stadium: Estádio Engenheiro Vidal Pinheiro; Referee: Edmundo Carvalho

11 February 1962 16	Benfica	4–2	Olhanense	Lisbon
16:00	Simões 27'; José Águas 30', 74'; Coluna 36'		20' Mateus; 60' Alfredo da Silva	Stadium: Estádio da Luz; Referee: Inácio Tereso

18 February 1961 17	Sporting da Covilhã	2–1	Benfica	Covilhã
15:00	Amilcar Cavém 52'; Chacho 77'		39' José Augusto	Stadium: Estádio Municipal José Santos Pinto; Referee: Abel Costa

4 March 1962 18	Benfica	4–2	Académica de Coimbra	Lisbon
15:00	Américo 12' (o.g.); José Águas 55'; Eusébio 68'; José Augusto 88'		33' Crispim; 77' Gaio	Stadium: Estádio da Luz; Referee: Mário Mendonça

11 March 1962 19	Belenenses	2–2	Benfica	Lisbon
15:00	Yaúca 49', 81'		19' José Augusto; 72' José Águas	Stadium: Estádio do Restelo; Referee: Joaquim Campos

18 March 1962 20	Lusitano de Èvora	0–1	Benfica	Évora
15:00			28' Cavém	Stadium: Complexo Desportivo do Lusitano; Referee: Inácio Tereso

1 April 1962 21	Benfica	1–1	Porto	Lisbon
15:00	José Águas 57'		18' Veríssimo	Stadium: Estádio da Luz; Referee: Vírgilio Baptista

8 April 1962 22	Atlético	0–3	Benfica	Lisbon
15:00			43', 87' Simões; 68' Mário João	Stadium: Estádio da Tapadinha; Referee: Eduardo Gouveia

15 April 1962 23	Benfica	1–1	CUF	Lisbon
16:00	José Águas 69'		44' (o.g.) Fernando Cruz	Stadium: Estádio da Luz; Referee: Francisco Guerra

15 May 1962 24	Vitória de Guimarães	2–2	Benfica	Guimarães
15:00	Amaro 21'; Rola 25'		49' José Torres; 90' António Mendes	Stadium: Estádio D. Afonso Henriques; Referee: João Pinto Ferreira

22 May 1962 25	Benfica	8–1	Beira-Mar	Lisbon
16:00	Eusébio 10', 24', 46'; Cavém 48'; José Águas 63', 66', 68'; José Augusto 78'		79' (o.g.) Germano	Stadium: Estádio da Luz; Referee: Encarnação Salgado

27 May 1962 26	Sporting	3–1	Benfica	Lisbon
16:00	Morais 20'; Hugo Sarmento 27'; Costa Pereira 40' (o.g.)		29' Eusébio	Stadium: Estádio de Alvalade; Referee: Décio Freiras

=== Taça de Portugal ===
==== First round ====
26 November 1961 First leg	Caldas	3–5	Benfica	Caldas da Rainha
16:00	Mirita 1', 86'; Janita 47'		7', 14' José Torres; 27', 40' Carlos Angeja; 65' Jorge Calado	Stadium: Campo da Mata; Referee: Ferreira dos Santos

31 December 1961 Second leg	Benfica	11–0 (16–3 agg.)	Caldas	Lisbon
16:00	José Torres 7', 65', 72'; Germano 9'; Santana 18', 31'; Cavém 53', 83', 89'; Simões 76'			Stadium: Estádio da Luz; Referee: Manuel Fragata

==== Second round ====
28 January 1962 First leg	Benfica	2–1	CUF	Lisbon
16:00	José Águas 13'; José Augusto 34'		4' Carlos Alberto	Stadium: Estádio da Luz; Referee: Manuel Fortunato

25 February 1962 Second leg	CUF	3–2 (4–4 agg.)	Benfica	Barreiro
16:00	António Medeiros 23', 75'; Carlos Alberto 66'		10', 37' (pen.) Eusébio	Stadium: Complexo Desportivo Alfredo da Silva; Referee: Renato Santos

27 February 1962 Replay	Benfica	2–0	CUF	Leiria
16:00	Eusébio 20'; Simões 74'			Stadium: Estádio Municipal; Referee: Clemente Henriques

==== Third round ====
25 March 1962 First leg	Porto	2–2	Benfica	Porto
16:00	Serafim 55'; Veríssimo 85'		3' Mendes; 51' Santana	Stadium: Estádio das Antas; Referee: Porfírio da Silva

22 April 1962 Second leg	Benfica	3–1 (5–3 agg.)	Porto	Lisbon
15:00	Simões 28', 50'; Eusébio 38'		4' Serafim	Stadium: Estádio da Luz; Referee: Manuel Fortunato

==== Quarter-final ====
3 June 1962 Second leg	Benfica	7–1	Ferrovíario	Lisbon
15:00	Carlos Angeja 34'; José Torres 47', 66', 69', 74', 80', 86'		83' Cruz	Stadium: Estádio da Luz; Referee: Manuel Barulho

10 June 1962 Second leg	Ferrovíario	1–7 (2–14 agg.)	Benfica	Lisbon
15:00	Sophos 84'		7', 86' Mendes; 44', 81' José Torres; 46' Nartanga; 47' Jorge Calado	Stadium: Estádio da Tapadinha; Referee: Inácio Tereso

==== Semi-final ====
17 June 1962 First leg	Vitória de Guimarães	2–2	Benfica	Guimarães
15:00	Pedras 28', 80'		57' Eusébio; 70' (o.g.) António Freitas	Stadium: Campo da Amorosa; Referee: Abel da Costa

24 June 1962 Second leg	Benfica	6–0 (8–2 agg.)	Vitória de Guimarães	Lisbon
16:00	José Águas 1'; José Augusto 13'; Eusébio 50', 70', 71', 82'			Stadium: Estádio da Luz; Referee: Virgílio Baptista

==== Final ====
1 July 1962	Benfica	3–0	Vitória de Setúbal	Oeiras
16:00	Eusébio 57', 84'; Cavém 68'			Stadium: Estádio Nacional; Referee: Manuel Fortunato

=== European Cup ===
==== First round ====
31 October 1961 First leg	Austria Wien	1–1	(Portugal) Benfica	Vienna
19:30	Stark 70'	Report	30' Águas	Stadium: Praterstadion; Attendance: 78,833; Referee: Joseph Barbéran (France)

8 November 1961 Second leg	Benfica (Portugal)	5–1 (6–2 agg.)	Austria Wien	Lisbon
21:45	Santana 4', 82'; Águas 36', 44'; Eusébio 69'	Report	80' (o.g.) Fernandes	Stadium: Estádio da Luz; Attendance: 50,000; Referee: Marcel Bois (France)

==== Quarter-final ====
1 February 1962 First leg	Nürnberg (Germany)	3–1	(Portugal) Benfica	Nuremberg
15:00	Flachenecker 31', 85'; Strehl 40'	Report	10' Cavém	Stadium: Städtisches Stadium; Attendance: 41,010; Referee: Thomas Wharton (Scotland)

22 February 1962 Second leg	Benfica (Portugal)	6–0 (7–3 agg.)	(West Germany) Nürnberg	Lisbon
21:45	Águas 3'; Eusébio 4', 55'; Coluna 20'; José Augusto 63', 78'	Report		Stadium: Estádio da Luz; Attendance: 55,000; Referee: Gino Rigato (Italy)

==== Semi-final ====
21 March 1962 First leg	Benfica (Portugal)	3–1	(England) Tottenham Hotspur	Lisbon
21:45	Simões 5'; Augusto 19', 64'	Report	55' Smith	Stadium: Estádio da Luz; Attendance: 60,000; Referee: Daniel Mellet (Switzerland)

5 April 1962 Second leg	Tottenham Hotspur (England)	2–1 (3–4 agg.)	(Portugal) Benfica	London
19:30	Smith 34'; Blanchflower 48' (pen.)	Report	15' Águas	Stadium: White Hart Lane; Attendance: 64,448; Referee: Aage Poulsen (Denmark)

===== Final =====
2 May 1962	Benfica (Portugal)	5–3	(Spain) Real Madrid	Amsterdam
19:30 CEST	Águas 25'; Cavém 34'; Coluna 51'; Eusébio 65', 68'	Report	17', 23', 38' Puskás	Stadium: Olympisch Stadion; Attendance: 61,257; Referee: Leo Horn (Netherlands)

=== Intercontinental Cup ===
4 September 1961 First leg	Benfica (Portugal)	1–0	(Uruguay) Peñarol	Lisbon
	Coluna 60'	Report		Stadium: Estádio da Luz; Attendance: 40,000; Referee: Othmar Huber (Switzerland)

17 September 1961 Second leg	Peñarol (Uruguay)	5–0	(Portugal) Benfica	Montevideo
	Sasía 10' (pen.); Joya 18', 28'; Spencer 42', 58'	Report	15' Águas	Stadium: Estadio Centenario; Attendance: 56,358; Referee: Carlos Nai Foino (Argentina)

19 September 1961 Replay	Peñarol (Uruguay)	2–1	(Portugal) Benfica	Montevideo
	Sasía 5', 85' (pen.)	Report	35' Eusébio	Stadium: Estadio Centenario; Attendance: 56,358; Referee: José Luis Praddaude (Argentina)

=== Friendlies ===
27 August 1961 Torneio Angola	Sporting	1–0	Benfica	Oeiras
	Figueiredo 1'			Stadium: Estádio Nacional

31 August 1961 Taça de Honra	Benfica	3–1	Atlético	Lisbon
	Santana 7', 15', 40'			Stadium: Estádio da Luz; Referee: Augusto Bailão

7 September 1960	Liège	0–1	Benfica	Liège
			71' Eusébio	Stadium: Stade Vélodrome de Rocourt

9 September 1961 Taça de Honra	Sporting CP	3–0	Benfica	Lisbon
	Géo 1', 72'; Serranito 82'			Stadium: Estádio Nacional

4 October 1961	Benfica	2–3	Eintracht Frankfurt	Lisbon
	Cavém 2'; Coluna 23'			Stadium: Estádio da Luz; Referee: Eduardo Gouveia

8 October 1961 Artur Tstm	Benfica	3–2	La Chaux-de-Fonds	Lisbon
				Stadium: Estádio da Luz; Referee: Anibal de Oliveira

11 October 1961	Royal Antwerp	1–3	Benfica	Antwerp
				Stadium: Bosuilstadion

22 October 1961	Barcelona	1–1	Benfica	Barcelona
			Santana	Stadium: Nou Camp

14 March 1962	Italy	4–1	Benfica	Milan
				Stadium: San Siro

1 June 1962	Al Ahly	3–2	Benfica	Cairo
	Badawi Abdel Fattah 4', 28'; Taha Ismail 64'		23' José Águas; 66' Eusébio	Stadium: Cairo International Stadium

3 June 1962	Cyprus XI	1–5	Benfica	Nicosia
			Eusébio; Santana	Stadium: GSP Stadium; Attendance: 5,000

6 June 1962	Omonia	2–6	Benfica	Nicosia
	Antonakis 9'; Pakkas 73'		26', 53' Eusébio; 27', 65' José Augusto; 44' José Águas; 62' Coluna	Stadium: GSP Stadium; Attendance: 5,000

8 June 1962	Fenerbahçe	1–4	Benfica	Istanbul
	Sefter 89'		38' Coluna; 40' Eusébio; 59' José Águas; 62' Coluna	Stadium: Sükrü Saracoglu Stadium; Attendance: 20,000

== Player statistics ==
The squad for the season consisted of the players listed in the tables below, as well as staff member Béla Guttman (manager), Fernando Cabrita (assistant manager). (Note: There were no fixed numbers assigned, and the positions used by the players may not have a modern equivalence, the tactic was closely matched for a 3–4–3)

Note 1: Note: Flags indicate national team as defined under FIFA eligibility rules. Players may hold more than one non-FIFA nationality.

Note 2: Players with squad numbers marked ‡ joined the club during the 1961–62 season via transfer, with more details in the following section.

No.	Pos	Nat	Player	Total		Primeira Divisão		Taça de Portugal		European Cup		Intercontinental Cup	
No.	Pos	Nat	Player	Apps	Goals	Apps	Goals	Apps	Goals	Apps	Goals	Apps	Goals
1	GK	(Portugal) POR	Costa Pereira	43	0	24	0	9	0	7	0	3	0
1	GK	(Portugal) POR	José Barroca	4	0	2	0	2	0	0	0	0	0
1	GK	(Portugal) POR	Armando Ramalho	2	0	0	0	2	0	0	0	0	0
2	DF	(Portugal) POR	Fernando Cruz	45	0	26	0	9	0	7	0	3	0
2	DF	(Portugal) POR	Manuel Serra	11	0	6	0	2	0	3	0	0	0
3	DF	(Portugal) POR	Mário João	31	1	15	1	9	0	5	0	2	0
3	DF	(Portugal) POR	Ângelo Martins	37	0	22	0	6	0	6	0	3	0
4	DF	(Portugal) POR	Germano de Figueiredo	24	3	13	2	6	1	5	0	0	0
4	DF	(Portugal) POR	Sidónio Manhiça	3	0	1	0	2	0	0	0	0	0
5	DF	(Portugal) POR	Jorge Nogueira	2	0	0	0	2	0	0	0	0	0
5	DF	(Portugal) POR	José Neto	23	0	13	0	6	0	1	0	3	0
5	DF	(Portugal) POR	Manuel Pinto	2	0	0	0	2	0	0	0	0	0
5	DF	(Portugal) POR	Humberto Fernandes	17	0	11	0	3	0	2	0	1	0
6	DF	(Portugal) POR	António Fonseca	2	0	1	0	1	0	0	0	0	0
6	MF	(Portugal) POR	Mário Coluna	40	9	24	6	6	0	7	2	3	1
7	FW	(Portugal) POR	José Augusto	39	19	23	13	6	2	7	4	3	0
7	MF	(Portugal) POR	António Saraiva	10	0	4	0	4	0	0	0	2	0
7	MF	(Portugal) POR	António Simões	24	8	11	3	7	4	5	1	1	0
7	MF	(Portugal) POR	Jorge Calado	3	2	0	0	3	2	0	0	0	0
8	MF	(Portugal) POR	Domiciano Cavém	40	10	24	3	6	5	7	2	3	0
9	FW	(Portugal) POR	José Águas	36	26	22	18	5	2	7	6	2	0
9	FW	(Portugal) POR	José Torres	8	15	2	2	6	13	0	0	0	0
10	FW	(Portugal) POR	Santana	29	11	19	6	6	3	2	2	2	0
10	FW	(Portugal) POR	Eusébio	31	29	17	12	7	11	6	5	1	1
11	FW	(Portugal) POR	António Mendes	6	4	1	1	4	3	0	0	1	0
11	DF	(Portugal) POR	Amândio Gonçalves	3	0	2	0	1	0	0	0	0	0
11^{‡}	FW	(Portugal) POR	Carlos Angeja	8	4	3	0	5	4	0	0	0	0
11	FW	(Portugal) POR	Nartanga	2	1	0	0	2	1	0	0	0	0
11	FW	(Portugal) POR	Alfredo Espírito Santo	4	0	0	0	4	0	0	0	0	0

== Transfers ==
=== In ===
Entry date	Position	Player	From club	Fee	Ref
28 August 1961	FW	Carlos Angeja	Atlético CP	Undisclosed	

=== Out ===
Exit date	Position	Player	To club	Fee	Ref
31 July 1961	DF	Artur Santos	None	Retired	
5 August 1961	MF	Francisco Palmeiro	Atlético CP	Undisclosed	
14 August 1961	GK	José de Bastos	Beira-Mar	Undisclosed	
17 August 1961	FW	Jorge Lopes	Académica	Undisclosed	
28 August 1961	MF	Álvaro Inácio	Atlético CP	Undisclosed	
28 August 1961	MF	Peres	Atlético CP	Undisclosed	
