= Montijo, Portugal =

Montijo
- Municipality
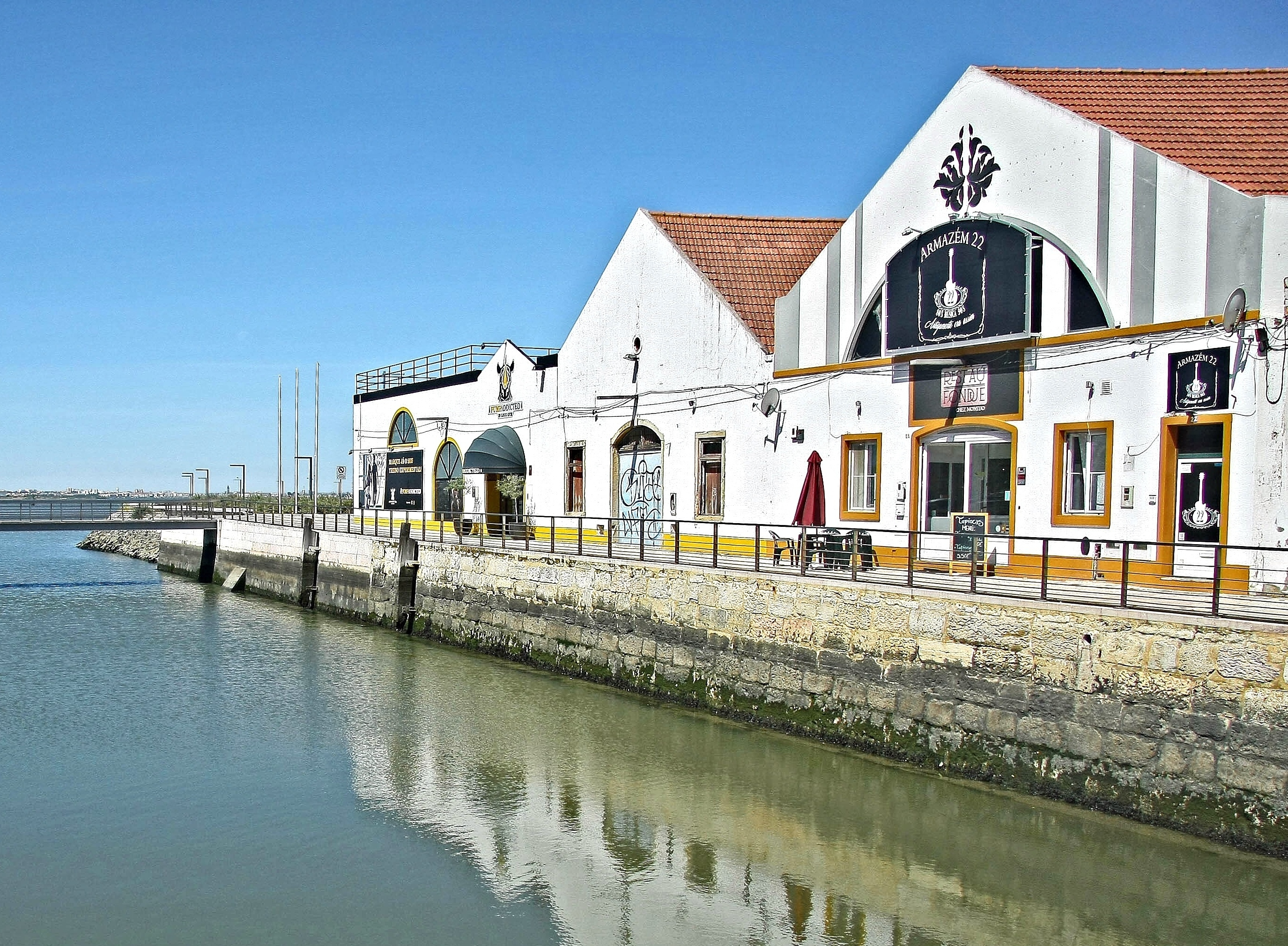
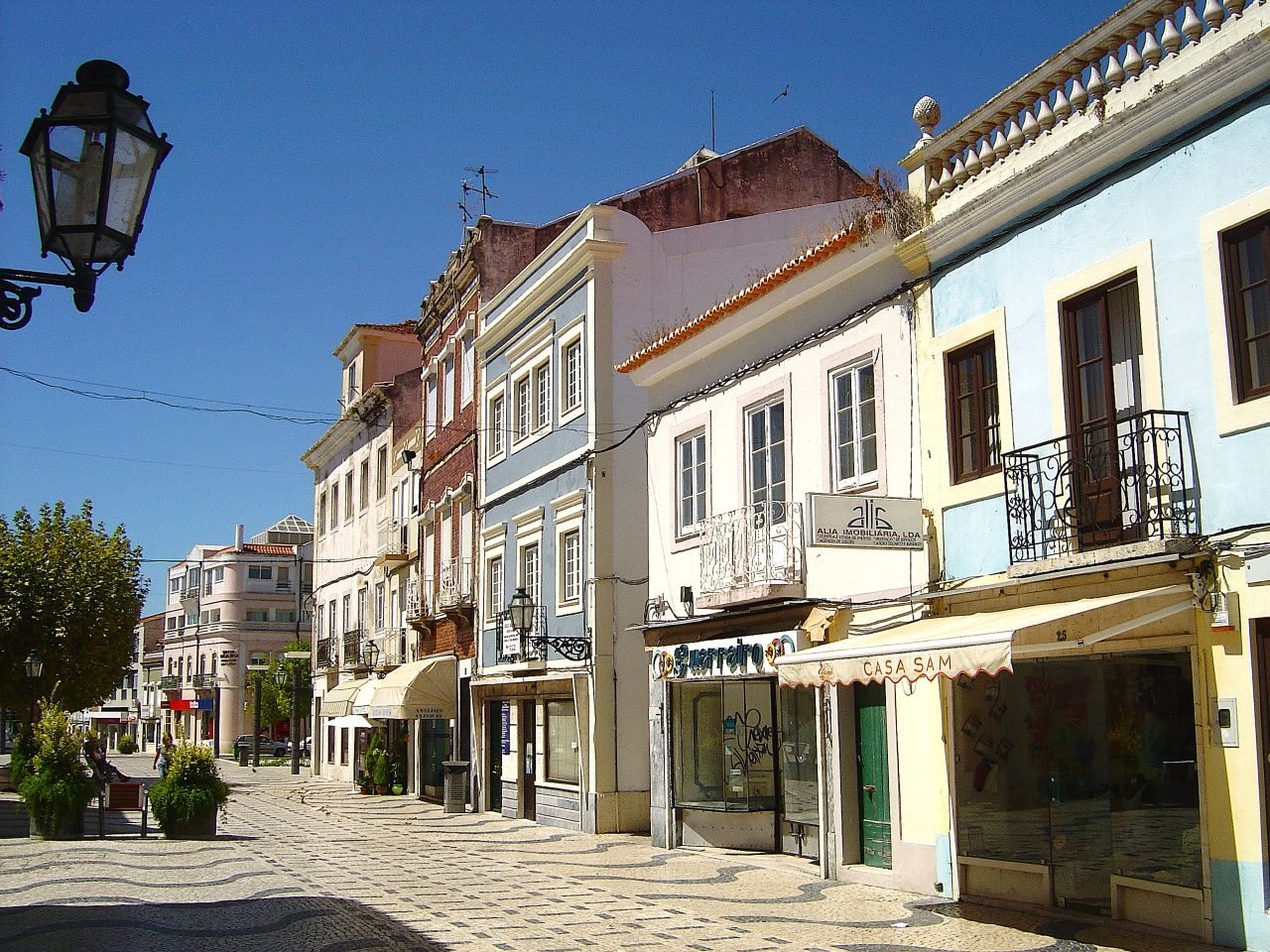
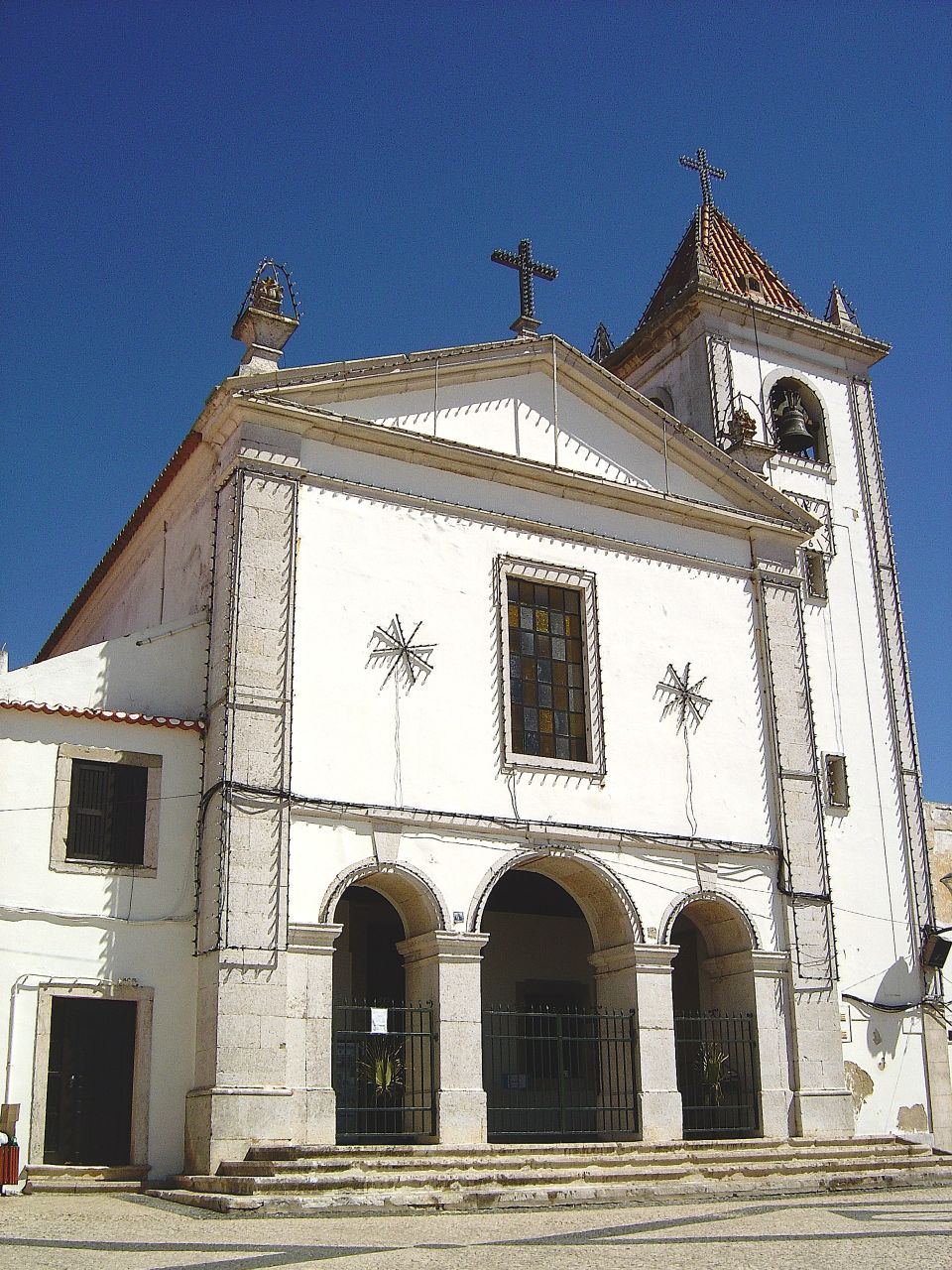
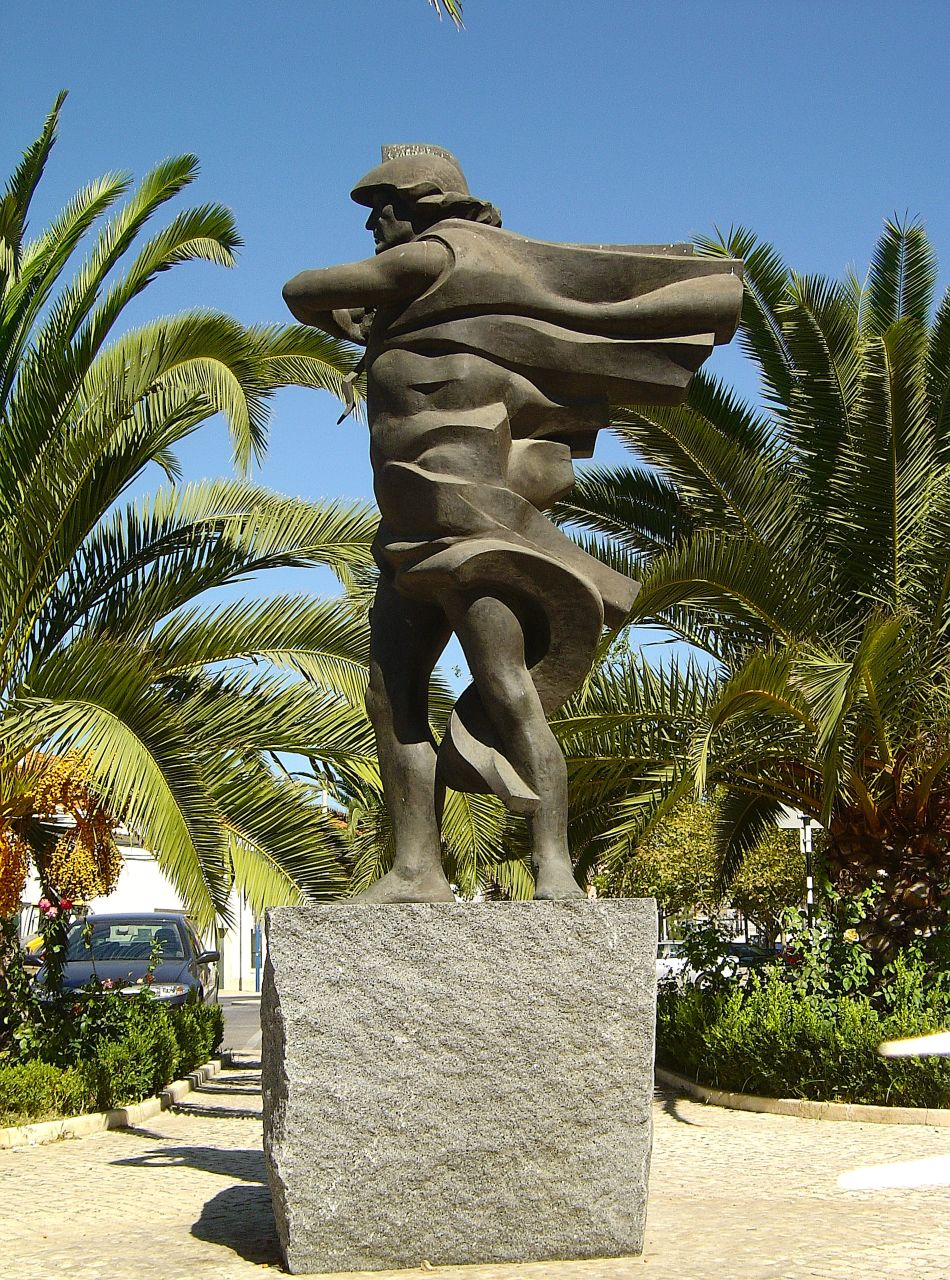
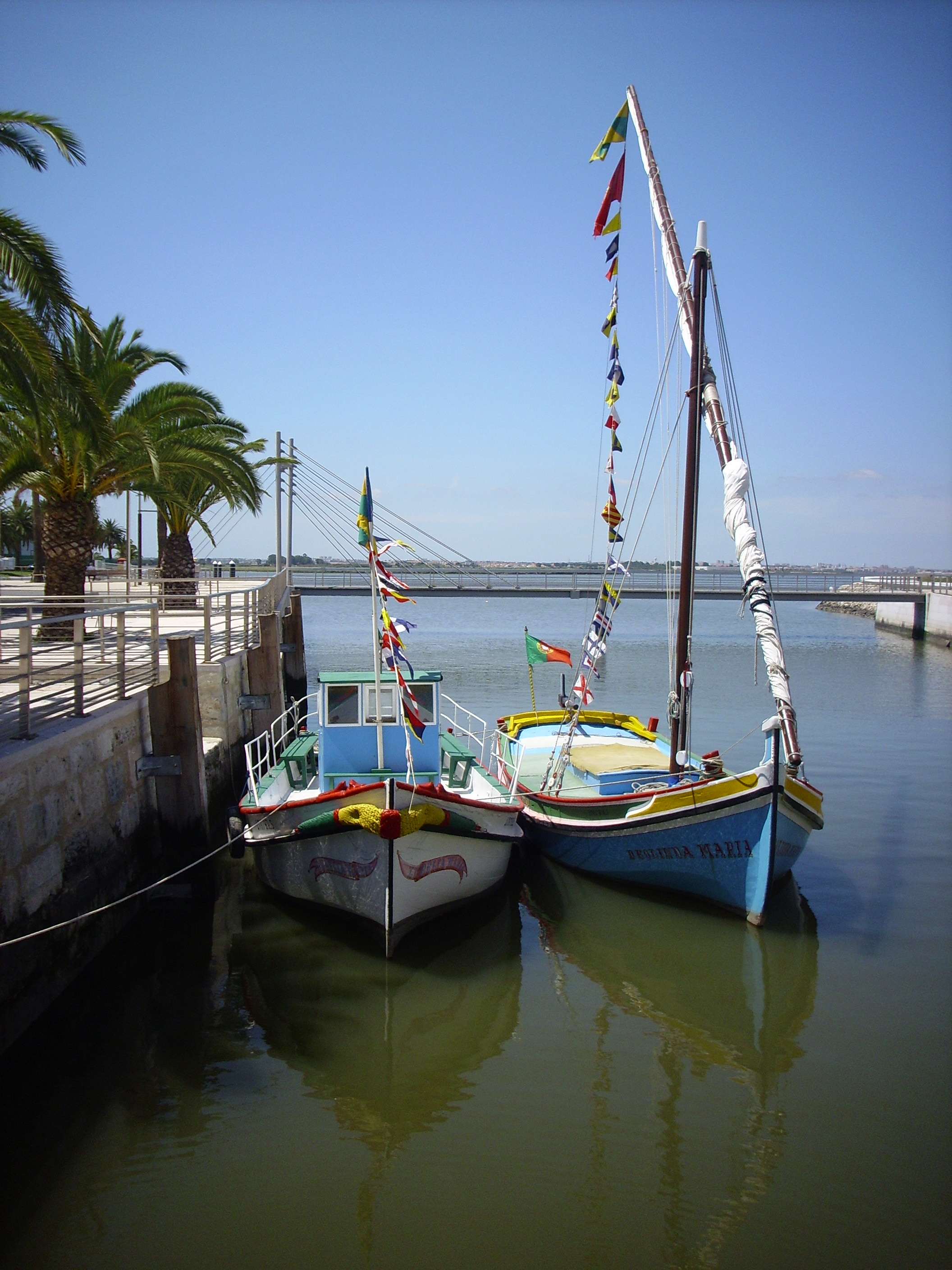
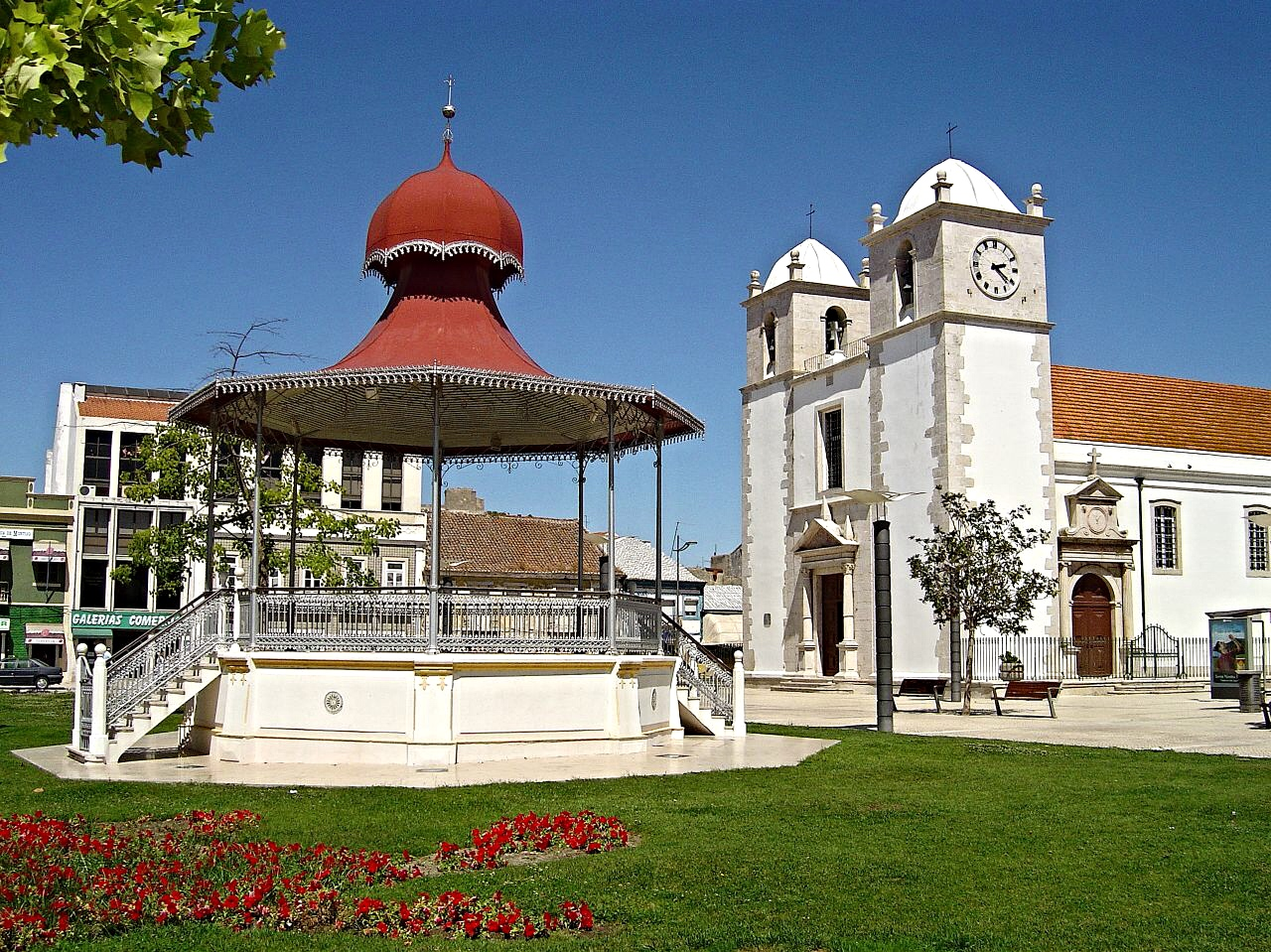
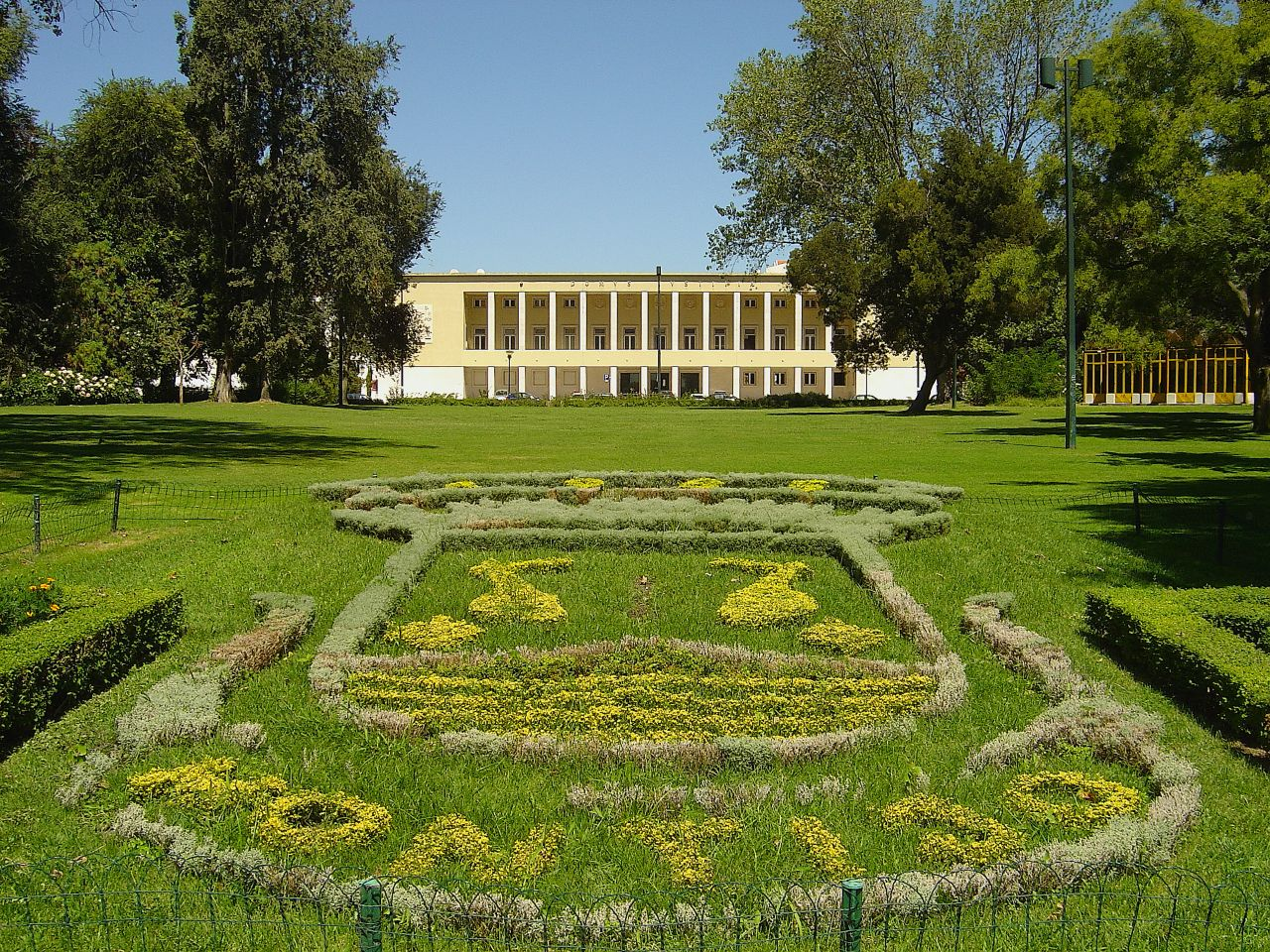

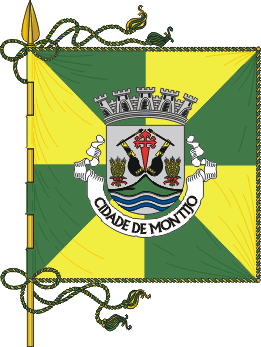
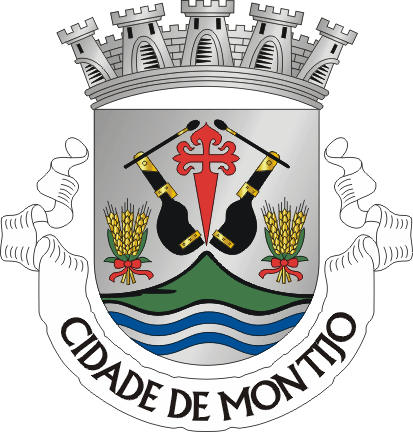
- Flag Coat of arms
- Interactive map of Montijo
- Coordinates: 38°41′N 08°54′W
- Country: Portugal
- Region: Lisbon
- Metropolitan area: Lisbon
- District: Setúbal
- Parishes: 5

Government
  - President: Nuno Canta (PS)

Area
  - Total: 348.62 km^{2} (134.60 sq mi)

Population (2021)
  - Total: 55,732
  - Density: 159.86/km^{2} (414.05/sq mi)
- Time zone: UTC+00:00 (WET)
  - Summer (DST): UTC+01:00 (WEST)
- Local holiday: Saint Peter; June 29
- Website: http://www.mun-montijo.pt

Montijo (Portuguese pronunciation: [mõˈtiʒu]), officially the City of Montijo (Portuguese: Cidade de Montijo), is a city and municipality in Setúbal District in Portugal. Its name was Aldeia Galega do Ribatejo or simply Aldeia Galega until 1930. The population in 2021 was 55,732, in an area of 348.62 km^{2}. The city of Montijo proper had a population of 25,719 in 2001.

It is one of the few municipalities in Portugal without territorial continuity; that is, its component parts are not conjoined. It is located in the Lisbon metropolitan area.

== History ==
Montijo was known as Aldeia Galega until July 6, 1930, in spite of the fact that it was a small town and no longer a village. It was elevated to city status on August 14, 1985.

Paleolithic vestiges of human settlement suggest that the region was occupied into the pre-history. Yet, the first historical references date to the 12th century, in 1186, with the donations of religious and hereditary lands to Paio Peres, that initiated formal occupation.

Initially, the settlement was a constituted of poor hovels, that were villages for fishermen and farmers, but by the 14th century, the area had developed into a sizeable centre, with its own church, dedicated to São Sebastião.

During the reigns of Afonso IV, Pedro and Fernando, Montijo was awarded various privileges that John I later confirmed in 1385. For a long time, the place formed one ecclesiastical parish with neighboring Alcochete, whose seat was in the village of Santa Maria de Sabonha, in the parish of São Francisco. On 15 September 1514, Manuel I conceded a foral (charter), which was quickly renewed on 17 January 1515, with Alcochete.

In 1539, the centres separated resulting in administrative autonomy. The grand postmaster, Luís Afonso, established his seat in the south in 1533, due to its geographic conditions and close proximity to Spain and southern Portugal. A year earlier, John III had registered the title to the village of Aldea Galega.

Over the years, many monarch passed through Montijo, such as the future John IV of Portugal, who arrived on 5 December 1640, to enthusiastic cheers from the nobles, clerics and people of the village.

In 1808 Montijo suffered the roaming attacks and pillage of French forces.

Twenty one years later, a carriage post between Montijo and Badajoz/Madrid, which was of short duration and lasted until 1831. In 1843, during an official visit, Queen Maria II of Portugal necessitated the carriage, allowing a 26-hour trip from Montijo to Badajoz. But, the service was suspended in 1864.

Aldeia Galega was one of the first centres to celebrate the implantation of the 5 October 1910 revolution, before Lisbon and other major centres.

== Climate ==
Climate data for Montijo (Base Aérea), 1971-2000 normals and extremes
Month	Jan	Feb	Mar	Apr	May	Jun	Jul	Aug	Sep	Oct	Nov	Dec	Year
Record high °C (°F)	21.0 (69.8)	25.0 (77.0)	28.6 (83.5)	29.8 (85.6)	37.5 (99.5)	39.5 (103.1)	43.2 (109.8)	39.0 (102.2)	39.0 (102.2)	33.2 (91.8)	27.4 (81.3)	23.8 (74.8)	43.2 (109.8)
Mean daily maximum °C (°F)	14.7 (58.5)	16.2 (61.2)	18.6 (65.5)	19.7 (67.5)	22.2 (72.0)	25.8 (78.4)	28.5 (83.3)	28.7 (83.7)	26.8 (80.2)	22.5 (72.5)	18.3 (64.9)	15.5 (59.9)	21.5 (70.6)
Daily mean °C (°F)	10.1 (50.2)	11.6 (52.9)	13.7 (56.7)	15.0 (59.0)	17.4 (63.3)	20.4 (68.7)	22.6 (72.7)	22.8 (73.0)	21.2 (70.2)	17.7 (63.9)	14.0 (57.2)	11.4 (52.5)	16.5 (61.7)
Mean daily minimum °C (°F)	5.8 (42.4)	7.2 (45.0)	8.6 (47.5)	10.2 (50.4)	12.4 (54.3)	14.9 (58.8)	16.6 (61.9)	16.8 (62.2)	15.6 (60.1)	12.7 (54.9)	9.4 (48.9)	7.3 (45.1)	11.5 (52.6)
Record low °C (°F)	−4.0 (24.8)	−2.0 (28.4)	−0.4 (31.3)	3.4 (38.1)	4.8 (40.6)	8.0 (46.4)	10.8 (51.4)	11.0 (51.8)	8.5 (47.3)	1.6 (34.9)	−0.5 (31.1)	−2.0 (28.4)	−4.0 (24.8)
Average rainfall mm (inches)	71.0 (2.80)	55.0 (2.17)	35.8 (1.41)	51.8 (2.04)	44.3 (1.74)	15.2 (0.60)	3.2 (0.13)	3.8 (0.15)	24.6 (0.97)	57.3 (2.26)	81.6 (3.21)	97.1 (3.82)	540.7 (21.3)
Average precipitation days (≥ 0.1 mm)	11.8	10.6	8.3	11.9	9.2	4.8	1.7	2.0	5.4	9.3	12.1	13.3	100.4
Mean monthly sunshine hours	150.4	159.9	217.2	236.7	279.5	304.2	341.8	338.4	255.5	216.8	160.1	128.4	2,788.9
Source: Instituto de Meteorologia

Climate data for Pegões, Montijo, 1971-2000 normals and extremes
Month	Jan	Feb	Mar	Apr	May	Jun	Jul	Aug	Sep	Oct	Nov	Dec	Year
Record high °C (°F)	22.5 (72.5)	28.0 (82.4)	30.0 (86.0)	32.2 (90.0)	35.6 (96.1)	43.3 (109.9)	44.0 (111.2)	41.1 (106.0)	40.6 (105.1)	34.9 (94.8)	28.5 (83.3)	24.5 (76.1)	44.0 (111.2)
Mean daily maximum °C (°F)	15.1 (59.2)	16.4 (61.5)	19.1 (66.4)	20.0 (68.0)	22.6 (72.7)	26.8 (80.2)	30.2 (86.4)	30.7 (87.3)	28.3 (82.9)	23.4 (74.1)	18.9 (66.0)	15.9 (60.6)	22.3 (72.1)
Daily mean °C (°F)	10.0 (50.0)	11.3 (52.3)	13.1 (55.6)	14.3 (57.7)	16.6 (61.9)	20.0 (68.0)	22.5 (72.5)	22.8 (73.0)	21.2 (70.2)	17.6 (63.7)	13.7 (56.7)	11.2 (52.2)	16.2 (61.2)
Mean daily minimum °C (°F)	4.9 (40.8)	6.2 (43.2)	7.1 (44.8)	8.5 (47.3)	10.6 (51.1)	13.1 (55.6)	14.9 (58.8)	14.9 (58.8)	14.1 (57.4)	11.7 (53.1)	8.6 (47.5)	6.5 (43.7)	10.1 (50.2)
Record low °C (°F)	−4.8 (23.4)	−3.2 (26.2)	−4.0 (24.8)	0.0 (32.0)	2.5 (36.5)	5.5 (41.9)	8.0 (46.4)	8.1 (46.6)	5.0 (41.0)	−0.5 (31.1)	−2.0 (28.4)	−4.0 (24.8)	−4.8 (23.4)
Average rainfall mm (inches)	94.7 (3.73)	74.0 (2.91)	41.6 (1.64)	59.7 (2.35)	54.9 (2.16)	21.0 (0.83)	7.8 (0.31)	6.5 (0.26)	26.4 (1.04)	77.3 (3.04)	94.0 (3.70)	115.7 (4.56)	673.6 (26.53)
Average precipitation days (≥ 0.1 mm)	11.2	10.2	7.8	9.9	7.6	3.3	1.1	1.4	4.1	8.7	9.3	11.6	86.2
Source: Instituto de Meteorologia

== Transport ==
The Vasco da Gama Bridge, inaugurated in 1998, connects Montijo with the capital city of Lisbon. Numerous roads, including the IC13, provide access to the south, east and west of Portugal.

Although the train service via the Ramal do Montijo rail line was discontinued, Montijo maintains a network of public transportation that connects it to other nearby major cities and villages by bus and by a river service connecting it with Lisbon.

== Parishes ==
Administratively, the municipality is divided into 5 civil parishes (freguesias):

- Atalaia e Alto Estanqueiro-Jardia
- Canha
- Montijo e Afonsoeiro
- Pegões
- Sarilhos Grandes

== Panorama ==
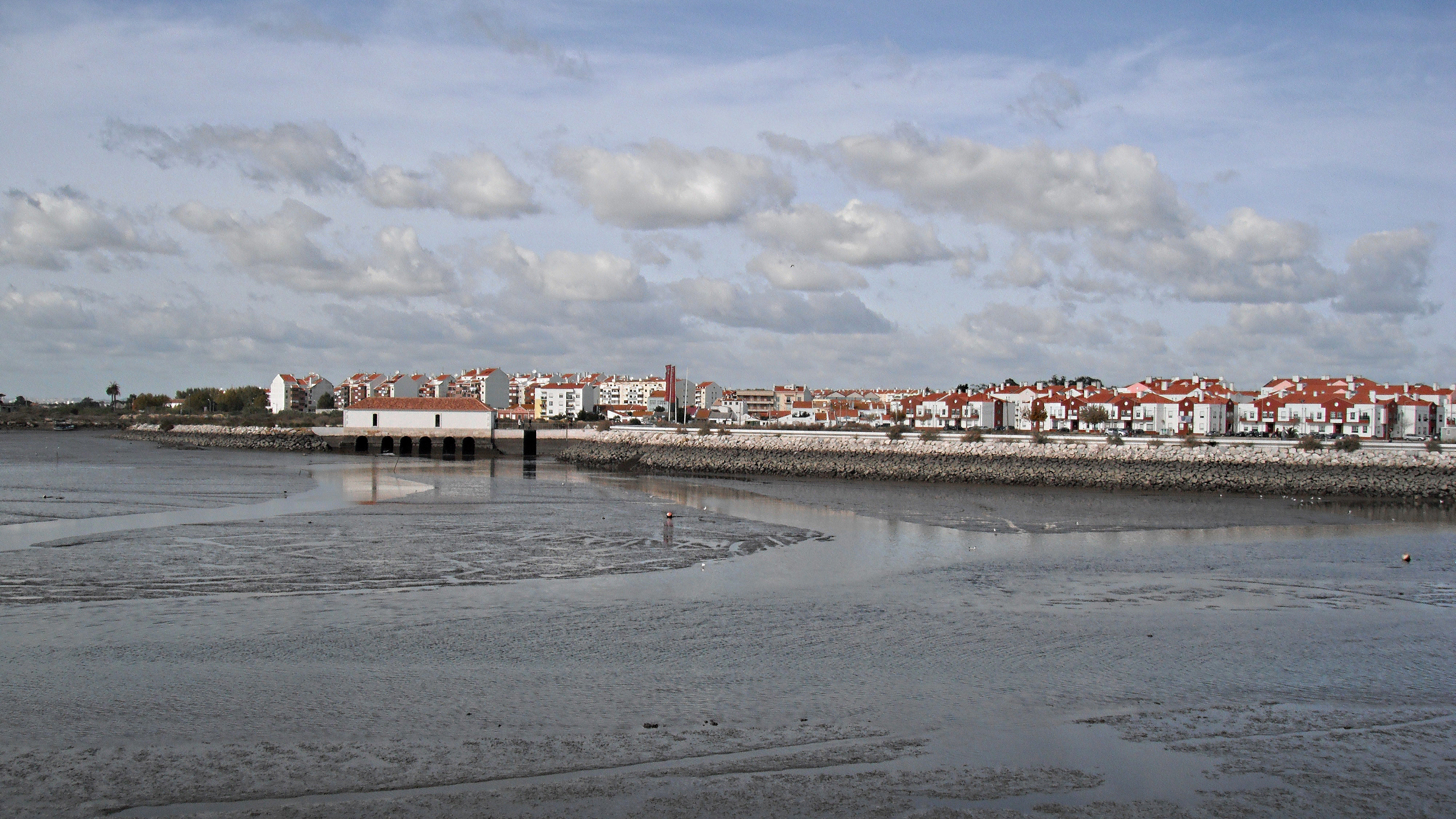
Panorama of Montijo

== Notable people ==
- Fialho Gouveia (1935–2004), TV entertainment pioneer and former radio host
- Jorge Peixinho (1940–1995), composer, pianist and conductor
- Dulce Pontes (born 1969), songwriter and pop, folk and classical music singer; helped revive fado
- Rosinha (born 1971), Pimba singer, songwriter and accordion player
- Catarina Marcelino (born 1971), anthropologist, politician and Govt. minister

=== Sport ===
- Custódio Pinto (1942–2004), footballer
- Paulo Futre (born 1966), footballer
- Ricardo (born 1976), footballer

== International relations ==
Montijo has no twin towns, but has international cooperation protocols with:

- Água Grande, São Tomé and Príncipe, since 2013
- Santa Catarina, Cape Verde, since 2010
- Svoge, Bulgaria, since 2010
