= Manuel Pinto (footballer) =

Portuguese footballer

Personal information
- Full name: Manuel Campos Pinto
- Date of birth: 14 December 1938 (age 87)
- Place of birth: Montijo, Portugal
- Position: Centre-back

Senior career*
Years	Team	Apps	(Gls)
1960–1962	Benfica	2	(0)
1962–1974	Vitória Guimarães	275	(15)
Total		277	(15)

International career
1969	Portugal	2	(0)
- * Club domestic league appearances and goals

Manuel Campos Pinto (born 14 December 1938) is a Portuguese former footballer who played as central defender.

== Club career ==
Born in Montijo, Setúbal District, Pinto started his professional career with S.L. Benfica. He was part of two Primeira Liga squads during his spell with the club, winning the 1960–61 edition but contributing only two matches to the feat.

The following 12 seasons, Pinto represented Vitória S.C. also of the top division. On 10 September 1969, he was on the starting XI for their first-ever game in European competition, against FC Baník Ostrava in the first round of the Inter-Cities Fairs Cup.

== International career ==
Pinto played twice with the Portugal national team over a one-month period. He earned his first cap on 6 April 1969, in a 0–0 friendly draw with Mexico.

== Personal life ==
Pinto's younger brother, Custódio, was also a footballer.

== Honours ==
Benfica

- Primeira Liga: 1960–61
- Taça de Portugal: 1961–62
