= Sidónio =

Sidónio is a Portuguese masculine given name which may refer to:

- Sidónio Pais (1872–1918), Portuguese politician, military officer, diplomat and president of the First Portuguese Republic
- Sidónio (footballer) (born 1939), Portuguese former footballer

== See also ==
- Sidonia, a feminine given name
- Sidonius Apollinaris (c. 430–before 490), Gallo-Roman poet, diplomat, bishop and saint
