= Fonseca =

Fonseca may refer to:

== People ==
- Fonseca (surname)
- Fonseca (singer), Colombian music artist
- Fonseca (footballer, born 1938)
- Fonseca (footballer, born 1966)

== Places ==
- Fonseca, La Guajira, town and municipality in Colombia
- Gulf of Fonseca, gulf in Central America
- Fonseca Island, a phantom island in the Atlantic

== Music ==
- Fonseca (album), an album by the eponymous Colombian artist Fonseca
- "Naam Hai Mera Fonseca", song from the 1991 Indian film Jo Jeeta Wohi Sikandar

== Other ==
- Fonseca (cigar brand), two brands of Cuban and Dominican cigars
- Fonseca (port), brand of Portuguese port wine
- Fonseca Atlético Clube, a Brazilian football (soccer) club
- Mossack Fonseca, a Panamanian law firm
