= Custódio Pinto =

Portuguese footballer

Personal information
- Full name: Custódio João Pinto
- Date of birth: 9 February 1942
- Place of birth: Montijo, Portugal
- Date of death: 21 February 2004 (aged 62)
- Place of death: Gondomar, Portugal
- Position: Midfielder

Youth career
- Montijo

Senior career*
Years	Team	Apps	(Gls)
1961–1971	Porto	243	(80)
1971–1975	Vitória Guimarães	116	(28)
1975–1978	Paços Ferreira		
1978–1979	Rio Tinto		
1980–1981	Oliveira Bairro	2	(0)
Total		361	(108)

International career
1964–1969	Portugal	13	(1)
Medal record
Men's football
Representing Portugal
FIFA World Cup
Third place	1966 England
- * Club domestic league appearances and goals

Custódio João Pinto (9 February 1942 – 21 February 2004) was a Portuguese footballer who played as a central midfielder.

== Club career ==
Born in Montijo, Setúbal District, Pinto made his senior debut with FC Porto, first appearing in the Primeira Liga at the age of 19. During his ten-year spell with the northerners he amassed competitive totals of 311 matches and 102 goals, but only won one trophy, the 1968 Portuguese Cup.

In the summer of 1971, Pinto signed with Minho club Vitória de Guimarães, where he would play four seasons (always in the top flight). He retired from professional football at 36 after a stint with F.C. Paços de Ferreira, but returned to the Segunda Liga two years later when he signed with Oliveira do Bairro SC.

== International career ==
Pinto earned 13 caps for Portugal, scoring once. He made his debut on 29 April 1964 by coming on as an 80th-minute substitute in a 3–2 friendly win over Switzerland in Zürich, and was selected to the squad that appeared in the 1966 FIFA World Cup, not leaving the bench for the third-placed team.

Pinto's last international match was played on 4 May 1969 in Porto, as Portugal drew 2–2 against Greece for the 1970 World Cup qualifiers, eventually finishing bottom in their group.

== Personal life ==
Pinto died on 21 February 2004 shortly after having celebrated his 62nd birthday, in the northern city of Gondomar.

His older brother, Manuel, was also an international footballer.

== Honours ==
Porto

- Taça de Portugal: 1967–68; runner-up: 1963–64

Portugal

- FIFA World Cup third place: 1966
