= Ricardo (footballer, born 1976) =

Portuguese footballer (born 1976)

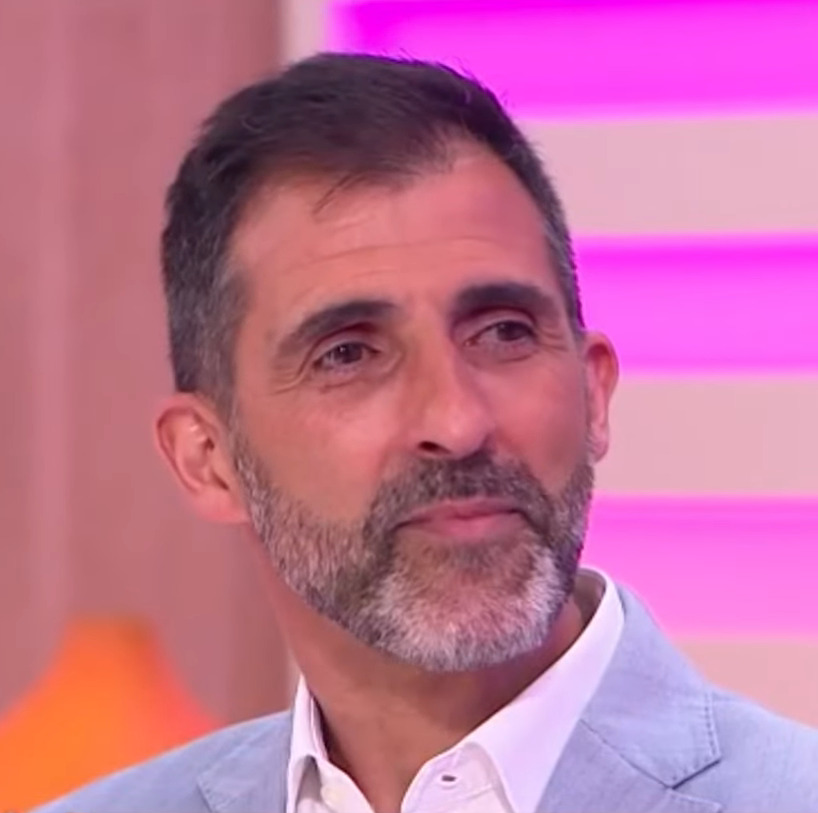
- Ricardo in 2024

Personal information
- Full name: Ricardo Alexandre Martins Soares Pereira
- Date of birth: 11 February 1976 (age 50)
- Place of birth: Montijo, Portugal
- Height: 1.85 m (6 ft 1 in)
- Position: Goalkeeper

Youth career
- 1987–1990: Unidos Barreiro
- 1990–1994: Montijo

Senior career*
| Years | Team | Apps | (Gls) |
| 1994–1995 | Montijo | 18 | (0) |
| 1995–2003 | Boavista | 154 | (1) |
| 2003–2007 | Sporting CP | 125 | (0) |
| 2007–2011 | Betis | 48 | (0) |
| 2011 | Leicester City | 8 | (0) |
| 2011–2012 | Vitória Setúbal | 3 | (0) |
| 2012–2014 | Olhanense | 13 | (0) |
| Total | | 369 | (1) |

International career
| 1997 | Portugal U21 | 1 | (0) |
| 2001–2008 | Portugal | 79 | (0) |
Medal record
Men's football
Representing Portugal
UEFA European Championship
| Runner-up | 2004 Portugal |
- * Club domestic league appearances and goals

Ricardo Alexandre Martins Soares Pereira OIH (Portuguese pronunciation: [ʁiˈkaɾðu]; born 11 February 1976), known simply as Ricardo, is a Portuguese former professional footballer who played as a goalkeeper.

He spent most of his career with Boavista and Sporting CP, helping the former to its only Primeira Liga title and appearing in 158 official matches with the latter, winning one Taça de Portugal. He moved abroad in his 30s, representing mainly Betis.

Ricardo won 79 caps for Portugal, playing in two World Cups and two European Championships, notably reaching the final at Euro 2004.

== Club career ==
=== Portugal ===
Born in Montijo, Setúbal, Ricardo started his career at hometown club Montijo, signing with Boavista in 1995. After initially battling for first-choice status with William Andem, he became first-choice and appeared in 28 matches in the Chequereds 2000–01 conquest of the Primeira Liga championship, the club's only title in their history.

Ricardo was one of the latter team's most influential players in their 2002–03 campaign in the UEFA Cup, in a run that would only stop in the competition's semi-finals. On 9 May 2003, through a penalty kick, he scored the only goal of the home win against Beira-Mar.

In the following off-season, Ricardo joined Sporting CP for a fee of €7 million and 20% from the value of any future transfer. An undisputed starter from his beginnings, he backstopped the side to the final of the 2004–05 UEFA Cup, a 3–1 loss to CSKA Moscow (the game was played at the Estádio José Alvalade).

=== Betis ===
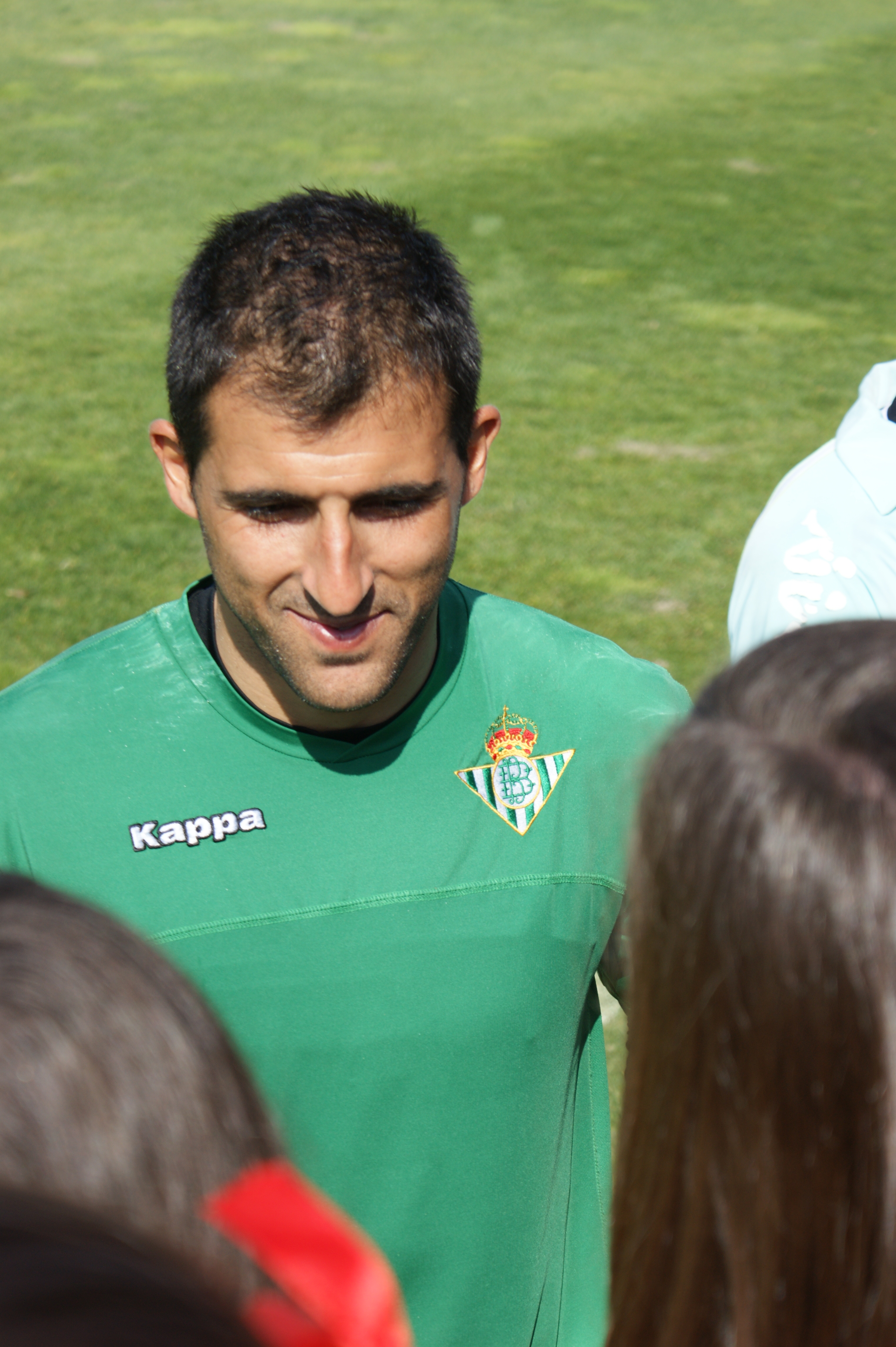
Ricardo with Betis in 2009

On 9 July 2007, Ricardo was linked with a transfer to Real Betis and, two days later, he signed a four-year contract with the La Liga club. His league debut took place against Recreativo de Huelva on 26 August, a 1–1 away draw; having started the season as first-choice, he eventually lost the position to trainee Casto, but would regain his status for two of the last three games as the Andalusians avoided relegation.

In 2008–09, as manager Paco Chaparro, who arrived midway through the previous season, started on the bench, Ricardo lost the battle for first-choice, having to settle with Copa del Rey matches, a situation which would revert midway through the campaign as Betis eventually suffered relegation. The following year he was backup to Iñaki Goitia, and made no appearances as his team finished fourth and were not promoted.

Ricardo was not given any shirt number for 2010–11, being limited to training with the Pepe Mel-led squad, and later released from his contract in January 2011 – it was due to expire in June of that year.

=== Later career ===
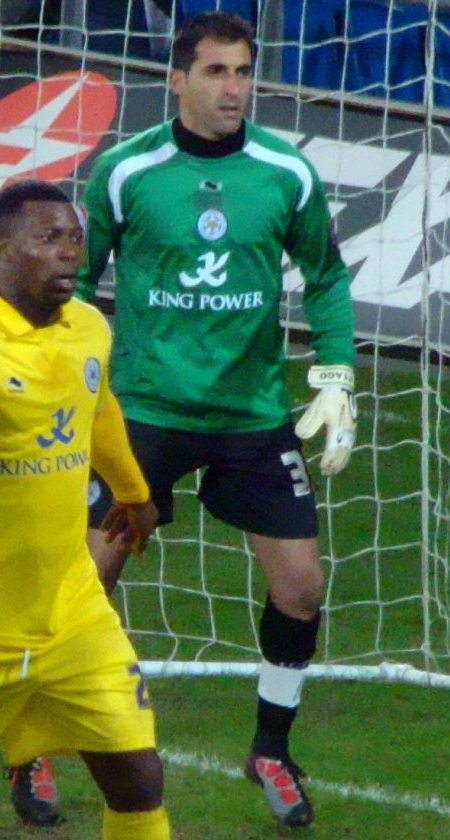
Ricardo with Leicester City in 2011

Ricardo started training with Football League Championship side Leicester City, and joined the team on 31 January 2011, signing until the end of the season, and citing manager Sven-Göran Eriksson as his motivation for making the move. He made his competitive debut on 12 February, in a 2–0 win over Derby County at Pride Park Stadium.

On 21 May 2011, Leicester confirmed it would not renew Ricardo's contract, due to expire on 30 June. In mid-August, he signed for Vitória de Setúbal, returning to his country after four years.

Ricardo retired in 2014 after two years with Olhanense. He remained on the Algarve, settling in Vilamoura and setting up R1 Real Estate.

== International career ==
Ricardo made his debut for the Portugal national team on 2 June 2001 against the Republic of Ireland, taking the place of Vítor Baía who was recovering from a serious knee injury. However, he would be his backup in the 2002 FIFA World Cup.

"I felt that I had to do something after conceding three penalties all in the centre of the goal. Taking the gloves off was what occurred to me at that moment and I did it to try and motivate myself and to put Vassell off."

— Jorge Vicente, UEFA.com

At UEFA Euro 2004, played on home soil, Ricardo helped Portugal to defeat England in the quarter-finals on penalties: with the score at 5–5, he first saved the shot of Darius Vassell with his gloves off, and then scored the deciding penalty. In the final against Greece, however, he misjudged a corner when coming for the ball, and Angelos Charisteas headed the only goal of the game.

Ricardo kept two clean sheets in the 2006 World Cup group stage, only being beaten by Mexico's Francisco Fonseca as the national side won all three matches. They once again knocked out England in the quarter-finals of a major tournament on penalties, as he saved from Frank Lampard, Steven Gerrard and Jamie Carragher in a 3–1 shootout victory after a 0–0 draw with extra time, becoming the first keeper to save three times in a World Cup shootout; the country finished fourth, and he was named to the tournament All-Star team as one of the three best goalkeepers.

Despite some criticism, Ricardo remained first-choice in Euro 2008, playing all of the matches as Portugal was eliminated by Germany 3–2 in the quarter-finals, where he misjudged two clearances which led to headed goals. After he lost his position at Betis he was not called up for the 2010 World Cup qualifiers, being replaced by S.L. Benfica's Quim and later Eduardo.

In March 2023, Ricardo was named the national team's new goalkeeper coach alongside Iñaki Bergara, following the appointment of Roberto Martínez.

== Career statistics ==
=== Club ===
Appearances and goals by club, season and competition
| Club | Season | League | | | National cup | | League cup | | Europe | | Other (Note: Includes Supertaça Cândido de Oliveira) | | Total | |
| Club | Season | Division | Apps | Goals | Apps | Goals | Apps | Goals | Apps | Goals | Apps | Goals | Apps | Goals |
|---|---|---|---|---|---|---|---|---|---|---|---|---|---|---|
| Montijo | 1994–95 | Segunda Divisão B | 18 | 0 | 0 | 0 | — | | — | | — | | 18 | 0 |
| Boavista | 1995–96 | Primeira Divisão | 0 | 0 | 0 | 0 | — | | — | | — | | 0 | 0 |
| Boavista | 1996–97 | Primeira Divisão | 16 | 0 | 6 | 0 | — | | 0 | 0 | — | | 22 | 0 |
| Boavista | 1997–98 | Primeira Divisão | 34 | 0 | 4 | 0 | — | | 2 | 0 | 2 | 0 | 42 | 0 |
| Boavista | 1998–99 | Primeira Divisão | 5 | 0 | 2 | 0 | — | | — | | — | | 7 | 0 |
| Boavista | 1999–2000 | Primeira Liga | 9 | 0 | 3 | 0 | — | | 3 | 0 | — | | 15 | 0 |
| Boavista | 2000–01 | Primeira Liga | 28 | 0 | 1 | 0 | — | | 2 | 0 | — | | 31 | 0 |
| Boavista | 2001–02 | Primeira Liga | 29 | 0 | 0 | 0 | — | | 12 | 0 | 1 | 0 | 42 | 0 |
| Boavista | 2002–03 | Primeira Liga | 33 | 1 | 0 | 0 | — | | 16 | 0 | — | | 49 | 1 |
| Boavista | Total | | 154 | 1 | 16 | 0 | — | | 35 | 0 | 3 | 0 | 208 | 1 |
| Sporting CP | 2003–04 | Primeira Liga | 34 | 0 | 0 | 0 | — | | 4 | 0 | — | | 38 | 0 |
| Sporting CP | 2004–05 | Primeira Liga | 33 | 0 | 0 | 0 | — | | 15 | 0 | — | | 48 | 0 |
| Sporting CP | 2005–06 | Primeira Liga | 30 | 0 | 3 | 0 | — | | 2 | 0 | — | | 35 | 0 |
| Sporting CP | 2006–07 | Primeira Liga | 28 | 0 | 3 | 0 | — | | 6 | 0 | — | | 37 | 0 |
| Sporting CP | Total | | 125 | 0 | 6 | 0 | — | | 27 | 0 | — | | 158 | 0 |
| Betis | 2007–08 | La Liga | 28 | 0 | 0 | 0 | — | | — | | — | | 28 | 0 |
| Betis | 2008–09 | La Liga | 20 | 0 | 6 | 0 | — | | — | | — | | 26 | 0 |
| Betis | 2009–10 | Segunda División | 0 | 0 | 0 | 0 | — | | — | | — | | 0 | 0 |
| Betis | 2010–11 | Segunda División | 0 | 0 | 0 | 0 | — | | — | | — | | 0 | 0 |
| Betis | Total | | 48 | 0 | 6 | 0 | — | | — | | — | | 54 | 0 |
| Leicester City | 2010–11 | Championship | 8 | 0 | 0 | 0 | — | | — | | — | | 8 | 0 |
| Vitória Setúbal | 2011–12 | Primeira Liga | 3 | 0 | 1 | 0 | 2 | 0 | — | | — | | 6 | 0 |
| Olhanense | 2012–13 | Primeira Liga | 5 | 0 | 1 | 0 | 3 | 0 | — | | — | | 9 | 0 |
| Olhanense | 2013–14 | Primeira Liga | 8 | 0 | 0 | 0 | 1 | 0 | — | | — | | 9 | 0 |
| Olhanense | Total | | 13 | 0 | 1 | 0 | 4 | 0 | — | | — | | 18 | 0 |
| Career total | | | 369 | 1 | 30 | 0 | 6 | 0 | 62 | 0 | 3 | 0 | 470 | 1 |

=== International ===
Appearances and goals by national team and year
| National team | Year | Apps | Goals |
|---|---|---|---|
| Portugal | 2001 | 7 | 0 |
| Portugal | 2002 | 5 | 0 |
| Portugal | 2003 | 11 | 0 |
| Portugal | 2004 | 15 | 0 |
| Portugal | 2005 | 8 | 0 |
| Portugal | 2006 | 15 | 0 |
| Portugal | 2007 | 11 | 0 |
| Portugal | 2008 | 7 | 0 |
| Total | | 79 | 0 |

== Honours ==
Boavista

- Primeira Liga: 2000–01
- Taça de Portugal: 1996–97
- Supertaça Cândido de Oliveira: 1997

Sporting CP

- Taça de Portugal: 2006–07
- UEFA Cup runner-up: 2004–05

Portugal

- UEFA European Championship runner-up: 2004

Individual

- FIFA World Cup All-Star Team: 2006

Orders

- Medal of Merit, Order of the Immaculate Conception of Vila Viçosa (House of Braganza)
