= 1962 Taça de Portugal final =

- Event: 1961–62 Taça de Portugal
Benfica	Vitória de Setúbal
3	0
- Date: 1 July 1962
- Venue: Estádio Nacional, Oeiras
- Referee: Manuel Fortunato (Évora)

The 1962 Taça de Portugal final was the final match of the 1961–62 Taça de Portugal, the 22nd season of the Taça de Portugal, the premier Portuguese football cup competition organized by the Portuguese Football Federation (FPF). The match was played on 1 July 1962 at the Estádio Nacional in Oeiras, and opposed two Primeira Liga sides: Benfica and Vitória de Setúbal. Benfica defeated Vitória de Setúbal 3–0 to claim the Taça de Portugal for an eleventh time.

== Match ==
=== Details ===
1 July 1962

Benfica	3–0	Vitória de Setúbal
Eusébio 57', 84'; Cavém 68'

Estádio Nacional, Oeiras
Referee: Manuel Fortunato (Évora)

Benfica	Vitória de Setúbal

GK	1	(Portugal) Costa Pereira
DF		(Portugal) Fernando Cruz
DF		(Portugal) Mário João
DF		(Portugal) Ângelo Martins
DF		(Portugal) Germano
MF		(Portugal) Domiciano Cavém
MF		(Portugal) Mário Coluna
MF		(Portugal) António Simões
FW		(Portugal) José Augusto
FW		(Portugal) José Águas (c)
FW		(Portugal) Eusébio
Substitutes:
Manager:
(Portugal) Fernando Caiado

GK	1	(Portugal) José Mourinho Félix
DF		(Portugal) Manuel Joaquim Coelho (c)
DF		(Portugal) Francisco Polido
DF		(Portugal) Herculano Oliveira
DF		(Portugal) Alfredo Moreira
DF		(Portugal) João Galaz
MF		(Portugal) Manuel Mateus
MF		(Portugal) Jaime Graça
FW		(Portugal) Quim
FW		(Portugal) José Dimas
FW		(Portugal) Manuel Pompeu
Substitutes:
Manager:
(Portugal) Fernando Vaz

1961–62 Taça de Portugal Winners
Benfica
11th Title

Match officials

- Assistant referees:
- Fourth official:

Match rules

- 90 minutes.
- 30 minutes of extra time if necessary.
