= Iñaki Bergara =

Spanish footballer and coach

Personal information
- Full name: Iñaki Bergara Iríbar
- Date of birth: 26 January 1962 (age 64)
- Place of birth: Ondarroa, Spain
- Height: 1.80 m (5 ft 11 in)
- Position: Goalkeeper

Youth career
- Athletic Bilbao

Senior career*
Years	Team	Apps	(Gls)
1982–1983	Bilbao Athletic	0	(0)
1983–1986	Alavés	53	(0)
1986–1989	Murcia	19	(0)
1989–1991	Real Sociedad	2	(0)
1991–1995	Logroñés	28	(0)
Total		102	(0)

International career
1980	Spain U18	1	(0)
- * Club domestic league appearances and goals

Iñaki Bergara Iríbar (born 26 January 1962) is a Spanish former professional footballer who played as a goalkeeper. He is currently a goalkeeper coach.

== Playing career ==
Born in Ondarroa, Biscay, Bergara began his career in his native Basque Country with Athletic Bilbao, and represented the Spain under-18 team in 1980. He made his professional debut with Deportivo Alavés, signing with Real Murcia CF of La Liga in 1986 and remaining in the top division the following nine seasons, but almost exclusively as a backup or third choice.

Bergara also played for Real Sociedad and CD Logroñés, appearing in 19 league matches during the 1994–95 campaign as the La Rioja side finished last with only 13 points and 79 goals conceded. He retired at the age of 33, due to a serious knee injury.

== Coaching career ==
After retiring from football, Bergara began working as a goalkeepers' coach, first with Javier Clemente at the club where he began his career, Athletic Bilbao. In 2007, he joined his compatriot Roberto Martínez's backroom staff at Swansea City.

In summer 2009, as the manager left for the Premier League to sign for Wigan Athletic, Bergara joined him at the Latics. The pair moved to Everton in July 2013.

Bergara followed Martínez to Belgium in August 2016, where he became one of the two goalkeeping coaches alongside Erwin Lemmens. Six years later, both he and Ricardo moved with the manager to another national team, Portugal.
