= Montijo e Afonsoeiro =

- Civil parish
- Location in Portugal
- Coordinates: 38.705°N 8.975°W
- Country: Portugal
- Region: Lisbon
- Metropolitan area: Lisbon
- District: Setúbal
- Municipality: Montijo

Area
  - Total: 31.46 km^{2} (12.15 sq mi)

Population (2011)
  - Total: 37,111
  - Density: 1,180/km^{2} (3,055/sq mi)
- Time zone: UTC+00:00 (WET)
  - Summer (DST): UTC+01:00 (WEST)

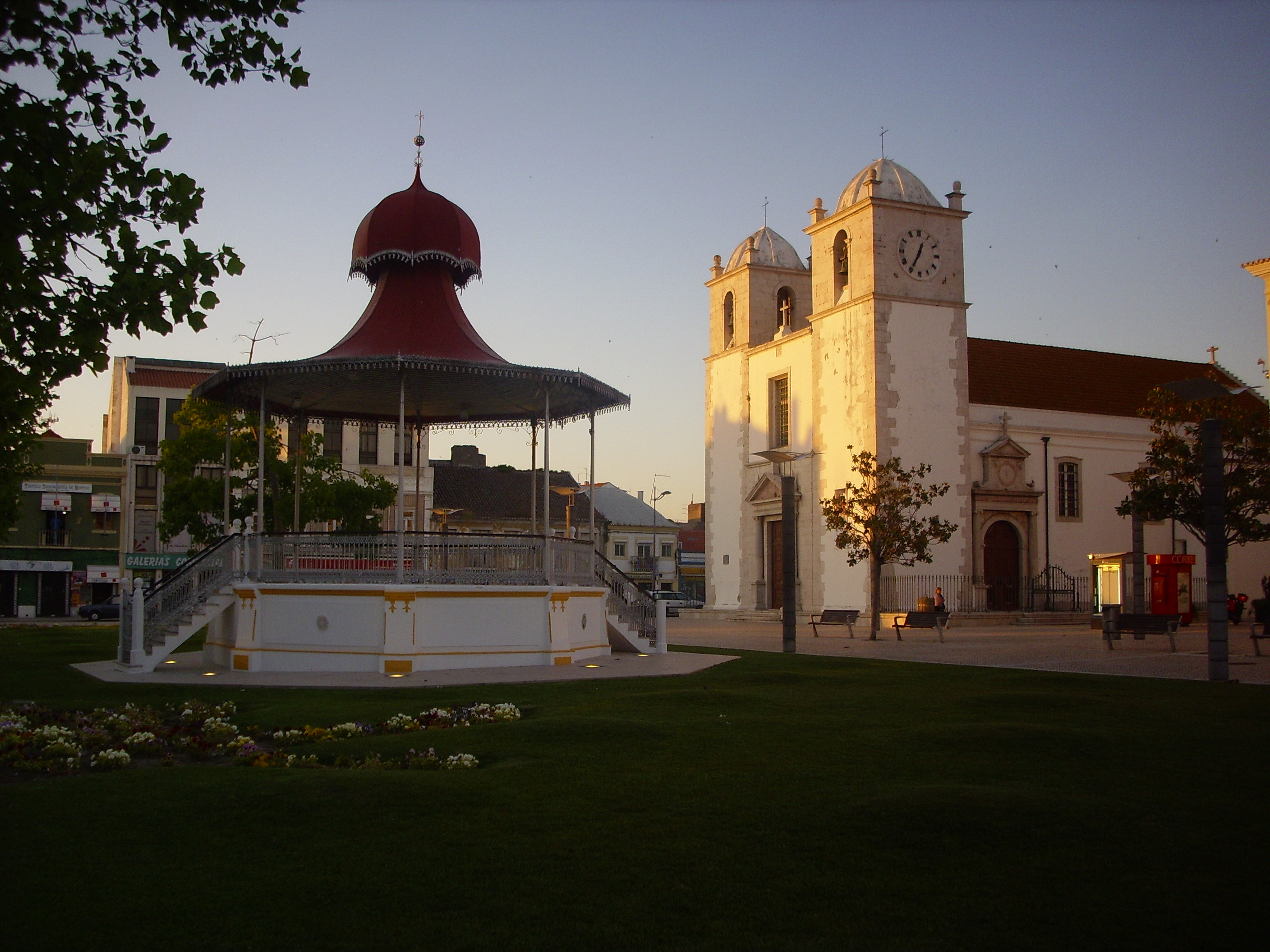
Bandstand of main Church of Bandstand and Main Church

Montijo e Afonsoeiro is a civil parish in the municipality of Montijo, Portugal. It was formed in 2013 by the merger of the former parishes Montijo and Afonsoeiro. The population in 2011 was 37,111, in an area of 31.46 km^{2}.
