= Nartanga =

Portuguese footballer (1937–2019)

Personal information
- Full name: João Lopes Cardoso
- Date of birth: 6 April 1937
- Date of death: 4 May 2019 (aged 82)
- Place of death: Aveiro, Portugal
- Position: Forward

Youth career
- –1960: Balantas
- 1960–1961: Benfica

Senior career*
Years	Team	Apps	(Gls)
1961–1962	Benfica	0	(0)
1962–1963	Sporting Covilhã		
1963–1964	Benfica Castelo Branco		
1964–1965	Marinhense		
1965–1967	Beira-Mar	33	(12)
1967–1968	Marinhense		
1968–1969	Gouveia		
1969–1970	Penafiel		
1970–1971	Nazarenos		
1971–1976	Alba		
1977–1978	Ala-Arriba		
1980–1981	Alba		
- * Club domestic league appearances and goals

João Lopes Cardoso (6 April 1937 – 4 May 2019), commonly known as Nartanga, was a Portuguese professional footballer.

== Career statistics ==
=== Club ===
Club	Season	League			Cup		Other		Total	
Club	Season	Division	Apps	Goals	Apps	Goals	Apps	Goals	Apps	Goals
Benfica	1960–61	Primeira Divisão	0	0	1	0	0	0	1	0
Benfica	1961–62	Primeira Divisão	0	0	2	1	0	0	2	1
Benfica	Total		0	0	3	1	0	0	3	1
Beira-Mar	1965–66	Primeira Divisão	22	6	0	0	0	0	22	6
Beira-Mar	1966–67	Primeira Divisão	11	6	0	0	0	0	11	6
Beira-Mar	Total		33	12	0	0	0	0	33	12
Career total			33	12	3	1	0	0	36	13
