= Jorge Nogueira =

Portuguese footballer

Personal information
- Full name: Jorge Augusto Santos Nogueira
- Date of birth: 29 September 1942 (age 84)
- Position: Defender

Youth career
- –1962: Benfica

Senior career*
Years	Team	Apps	(Gls)
1962	Benfica	0	(0)
1962–1967	Sporting Covilhã		

International career
1961	Portugal U18	5	(0)
- * Club domestic league appearances and goals

Jorge Augusto Santos Nogueira (born 22 April 1958) is a former Portuguese professional footballer.</coach>Jorge Nogueira at ForaDeJogo (archived)</coach>

== Career statistics ==
=== Club ===
Club	Season	League			Cup		Other		Total	
Club	Season	Division	Apps	Goals	Apps	Goals	Apps	Goals	Apps	Goals
Benfica	1961–62	Primeira Divisão	0	0	2	0	0	0	2	0
Career total			0	0	2	0	0	0	2	0
