= Carlos Angeja =

Portuguese footballer (born 1936)

Personal information
- Full name: Carlos Alberto Silva Angeja
- Date of birth: 12 November 1936 (age 89)
- Position: Forward

Youth career
- –1954: Belenenses

Senior career*
| Years | Team | Apps | (Gls) |
| 1954–1958 | Belenenses | 3 | (0) |
| 1959–1961 | Atlético CP | 48 | (15) |
| 1961–1962 | Benfica | 3 | (0) |
| 1962–1963 | Atlético CP | 23 | (3) |
| 1963–1964 | Belenenses | 4 | (1) |
| 1965–1968 | Atlético CP | | |
| 1968–1970 | Amora | | |

International career
| 1954 | Portugal U18 | 5 | (0) |
- * Club domestic league appearances and goals

Carlos Alberto Silva Angeja (born 12 November 1936) is a former Portuguese professional footballer.

== Career statistics ==
=== Club ===
| Club | Season | League | | | Cup | | Other | | Total | |
| Club | Season | Division | Apps | Goals | Apps | Goals | Apps | Goals | Apps | Goals |
|---|---|---|---|---|---|---|---|---|---|---|
| Belenenses | 1954–55 | Primeira Divisão | 1 | 0 | 0 | 0 | 0 | 0 | 1 | 0 |
| Belenenses | 1955–56 | Primeira Divisão | 1 | 0 | 0 | 0 | 0 | 0 | 1 | 0 |
| Belenenses | 1956–57 | Primeira Divisão | 0 | 0 | 0 | 0 | 0 | 0 | 0 | 0 |
| Belenenses | 1957–58 | Primeira Divisão | 1 | 0 | 0 | 0 | 0 | 0 | 1 | 0 |
| Belenenses | Total | | 3 | 0 | 0 | 0 | 0 | 0 | 3 | 0 |
| Atlético CP | 1959–60 | Primeira Divisão | 24 | 8 | 0 | 0 | 0 | 0 | 24 | 8 |
| Atlético CP | 1960–61 | Primeira Divisão | 24 | 7 | 0 | 0 | 0 | 0 | 24 | 7 |
| Atlético CP | Total | | 48 | 15 | 0 | 0 | 0 | 0 | 48 | 15 |
| Benfica | 1961–62 | Primeira Divisão | 3 | 0 | 5 | 4 | 0 | 0 | 8 | 4 |
| Atlético CP | 1962–63 | Primeira Divisão | 23 | 3 | 0 | 0 | 0 | 0 | 23 | 3 |
| Belenenses | 1963–64 | Primeira Divisão | 4 | 1 | 0 | 0 | 1 (Note: Appearances in the Fairs Cup) | 0 | 5 | 1 |
| Atlético CP | 1966–67 | Primeira Divisão | 24 | 1 | 0 | 0 | 0 | 0 | 24 | 1 |
| Career total | | | 105 | 20 | 5 | 4 | 1 | 0 | 111 | 24 |
