= Alfredo Moreira =

Portuguese footballer

Personal information
- Full name: Alfredo Teixeira Moreira
- Date of birth: 1 November 1938 (age 87)
- Place of birth: Setúbal, Portugal
- Position: Defender

Senior career*
Years	Team	Apps	(Gls)
- Sporting CP

International career
1965	Portugal	1	(0)
- * Club domestic league appearances and goals

Alfredo Teixeira Moreira (born 1 November 1938) is a retired Portuguese football defender.
