= José Dimas =

Portuguese footballer (1930–2007)

Dimas
Personal information
- Full name: José Romão Dimas
- Date of birth: 7 May 1930
- Place of birth: Almada, Portugal
- Date of death: 5 October 2007 (aged 77)
- Position: Winger

Youth career
- 1946–1947: Ginásio do Sul

Senior career*
Years	Team	Apps	(Gls)
1947–1949	Ginásio do Sul		
1949–1952	Vitória Setúbal		
1952–1961	Belenenses		
1961–1962	Vitória Setúbal		
1962–1963	Cova Piedade		
1963–1964	Naval		

International career
1955–1956	Portugal	3	(0)
- * Club domestic league appearances and goals

José Romão Dimas (7 May 1930 – 5 October 2007) was a Portuguese footballer who played as a winger. Dimas was born in Almada on 7 May 1930, and died on 5 October 2007, at the age of 77.
