= Montijo (parish) =

- Civil parish
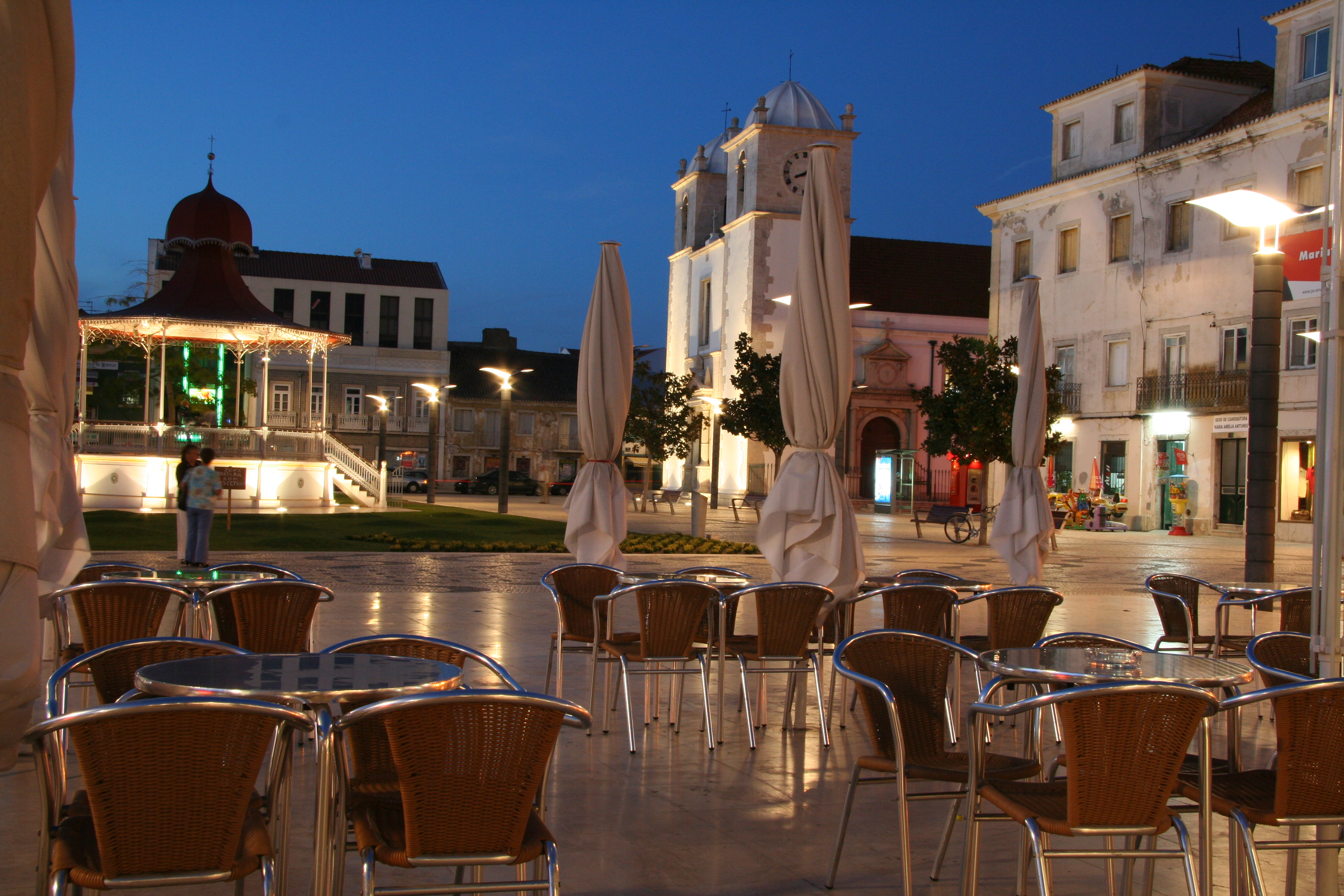
- The main square of Montijo by twilight

- Location in Portugal
- Coordinates: 38°42′N 8°58′W
- Country: Portugal
- Region: Lisbon
- Metropolitan area: Lisbon
- District: Setúbal
- Municipality: Montijo
- Disbanded: 2013

Area
  - Total: 27.25 km^{2} (10.52 sq mi)

Population (2021)
  - Total: 55,732
  - Density: 2,045/km^{2} (5,297/sq mi)
- Time zone: UTC+00:00 (WET)
  - Summer (DST): UTC+01:00 (WEST)
- Postal code: 2870-114
- Area code: 212

Montijo is a former civil parish in the municipality of Montijo, central Portugal. In 2013, the parish merged into the new parish Montijo e Afonsoeiro. The population in 2021 was 55,732, in an area of 27.25 square kilometres (10.52 mi^{2}) km^{2}.
