= Sidónio (footballer) =

Portuguese footballer (born 1939)

Personal information
- Full name: Sidónio da Silva Bastos Manhiça
- Date of birth: 16 April 1939 (age 87)
- Position: Defender

Youth career
- 1956–1961: Benfica

Senior career*
Years	Team	Apps	(Gls)
1961–1962	Benfica	2	(0)
1962–1963	Atlético CP	21	(0)
1963–1971	Varzim	186	(6)
1971–1972	Fafe		
1972–1974	Varzim		
- * Club domestic league appearances and goals

Sidónio da Silva Bastos Manhiça (born 16 April 1939) is a former Portuguese professional footballer.

== Career statistics ==
=== Club ===
Club	Season	League			Cup		Other		Total	
Club	Season	Division	Apps	Goals	Apps	Goals	Apps	Goals	Apps	Goals
Benfica	1960–61	Primeira Divisão	1	0	2	0	0	0	3	0
Benfica	1961–62	Primeira Divisão	1	0	2	0	0	0	3	0
Benfica	Total		2	0	4	0	0	0	6	0
Atlético CP	1960–61	Primeira Divisão	21	0	0	0	0	0	21	0
Varzim	1963–64	Primeira Divisão	26	1	0	0	0	0	26	1
Varzim	1964–65	Primeira Divisão	15	0	0	0	0	0	15	0
Varzim	1965–66	Primeira Divisão	26	2	0	0	0	0	26	2
Varzim	1966–67	Primeira Divisão	17	1	1	0	0	0	18	1
Varzim	1967–68	Primeira Divisão	25	1	0	0	0	0	25	1
Varzim	1968–69	Primeira Divisão	26	0	0	0	0	0	26	0
Varzim	1969–70	Primeira Divisão	25	1	0	0	0	0	25	1
Varzim	1970–71	Primeira Divisão	26	0	0	0	0	0	26	0
Varzim	Total		186	6	1	0	0	0	187	6
Career total			209	0	5	0	0	0	214	0
