= Fonseca (footballer, born 1938) =

Portuguese footballer

Personal information
- Full name: António Albuquerque de Almeida Fonseca
- Date of birth: 30 April 1938 (age 88)
- Position: Defender

Youth career
- –1958: Atlético CP

Senior career*
| Years | Team | Apps | (Gls) |
| 1958–1961 | Atlético CP | | |
| 1961–1962 | Benfica | 1 | (0) |
| 1962–1963 | Vitória Guimarães | 4 | (0) |
| 1963–1965 | Varzim | 41 | (0) |
| 1965–1966 | Barreirense | 9 | (2) |
- * Club domestic league appearances and goals

António Albuquerque de Almeida Fonseca (born 30 April 1938) is a former Portuguese professional footballer.

== Career statistics ==
=== Club ===
| Club | Season | League | | | Cup | | Other | | Total | |
| Club | Season | Division | Apps | Goals | Apps | Goals | Apps | Goals | Apps | Goals |
|---|---|---|---|---|---|---|---|---|---|---|
| Atlético CP | 1959–60 | Primeira Divisão | 9 | 0 | 0 | 0 | 0 | 0 | 9 | 0 |
| Atlético CP | 1960–61 | Primeira Divisão | 13 | 1 | 0 | 0 | 0 | 0 | 13 | 1 |
| Atlético CP | Total | | 22 | 1 | 0 | 0 | 0 | 0 | 22 | 1 |
| Benfica | 1961–62 | Primeira Divisão | 1 | 0 | 1 | 0 | 0 | 0 | 2 | 0 |
| Vitória Guimarães | 1962–63 | Primeira Divisão | 4 | 0 | 0 | 0 | 0 | 0 | 4 | 0 |
| Varzim | 1963–64 | Primeira Divisão | 26 | 0 | 0 | 0 | 0 | 0 | 26 | 0 |
| Varzim | 1964–65 | Primeira Divisão | 15 | 0 | 0 | 0 | 0 | 0 | 15 | 0 |
| Varzim | Total | | 41 | 0 | 0 | 0 | 0 | 0 | 41 | 0 |
| Barreirense | 1965–66 | Primeira Divisão | 9 | 2 | 0 | 0 | 0 | 0 | 9 | 2 |
| Career total | | | 77 | 3 | 1 | 0 | 0 | 0 | 78 | 3 |
