= List of Bowling Green State University buildings =

This is a list of buildings owned by Bowling Green State University in Bowling Green, Ohio, and its regional campuses in Perrysburg and Huron.

== Main Campus ==
=== Educational Memorabilia Center ===
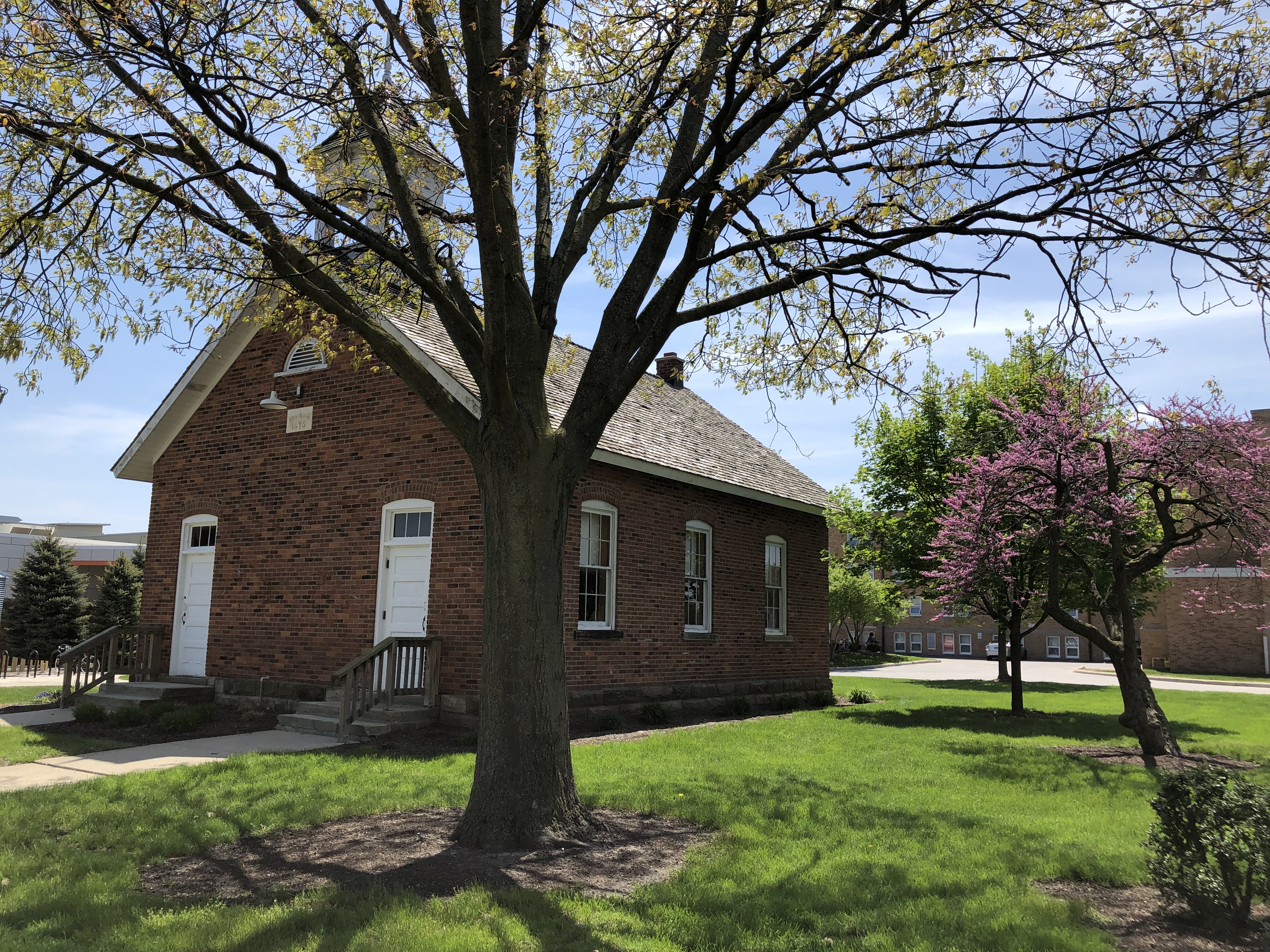
The Center is also simply referred to as the Little Red Schoolhouse.

Originally was a one-room school in Huron County, Ohio that operated from 1875 to the 1930s. Moved to campus in 1975 to commemorate its 100th year standing. It is used as a museum of educational history. Education students ring its bell as a tradition, which began in 2017. The date plate on the building was originally sourced from a tombstone.

=== University Hall ===
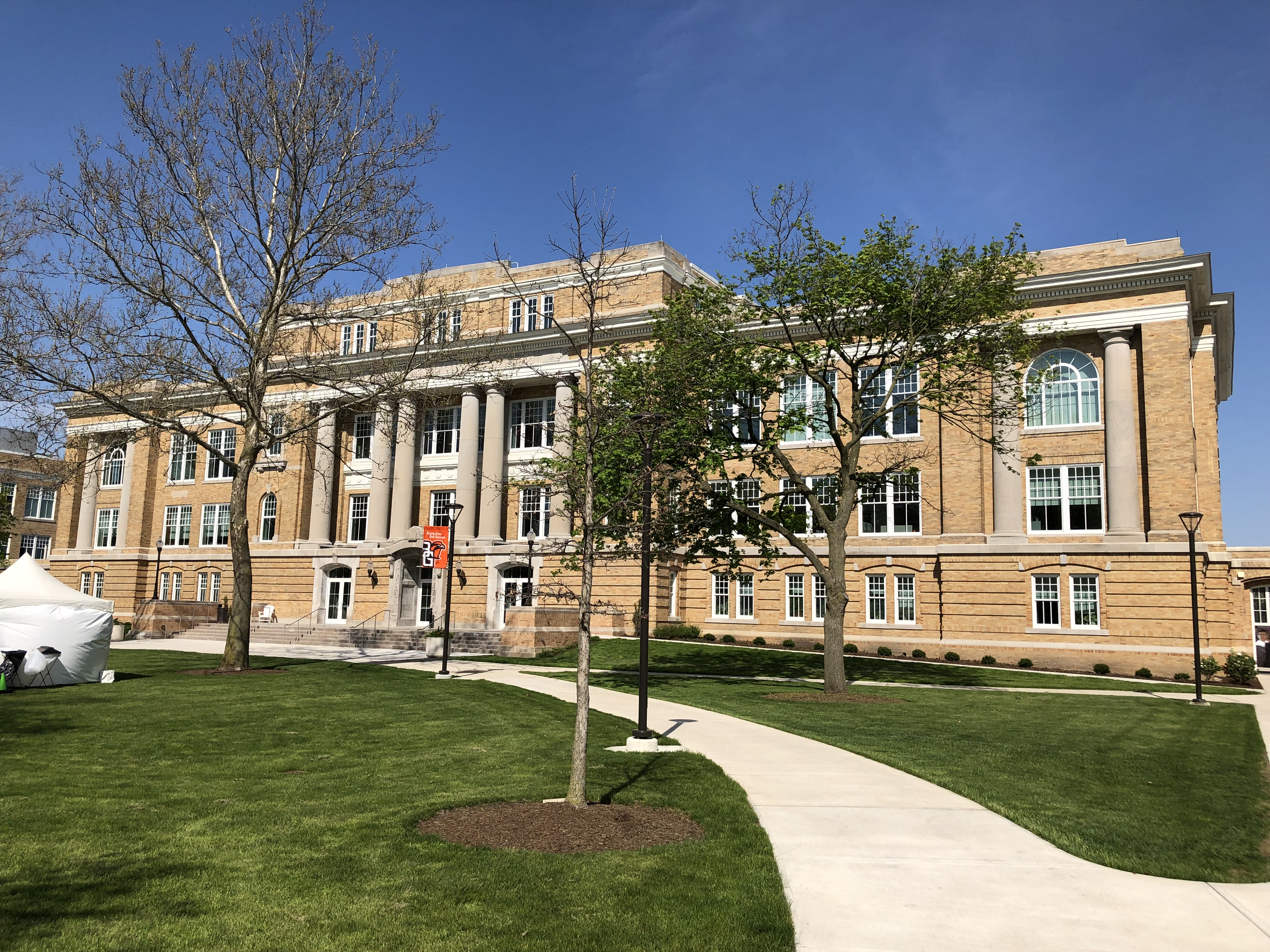
University Hall

Originally built in 1915 as the first building on the campus, University Hall cost $150,000 to construct and was intended to be the focal point of the campus, initially housing an administrative offices, auditorium, library, and classrooms, but has also housed a recreation hall, theatre, and the University's first basketball arena. Lucky Fingers, the final play of Lennox Robinson had its world premiere at University Theater on January 19, 1948. Then Senator John F. Kennedy held a speech inside this building (Then called Administration Hall), on September 19, 1959, with 1,500 in attendance, and 500 needing to be turned away due to a lack of seating. Joe Biden held a rally in front of this building on November 1, 2008. Until it was renovated in 2017, University Hall housed two theatres, the Center for Teaching, Learning, and Technology, Language and Math laboratories, and many classrooms. In 2016 renovations began and were completed by 2017. The classrooms have been upgraded to enhance active learning. The renovations also earned the building a LEED Gold certification.

=== Williams Hall ===
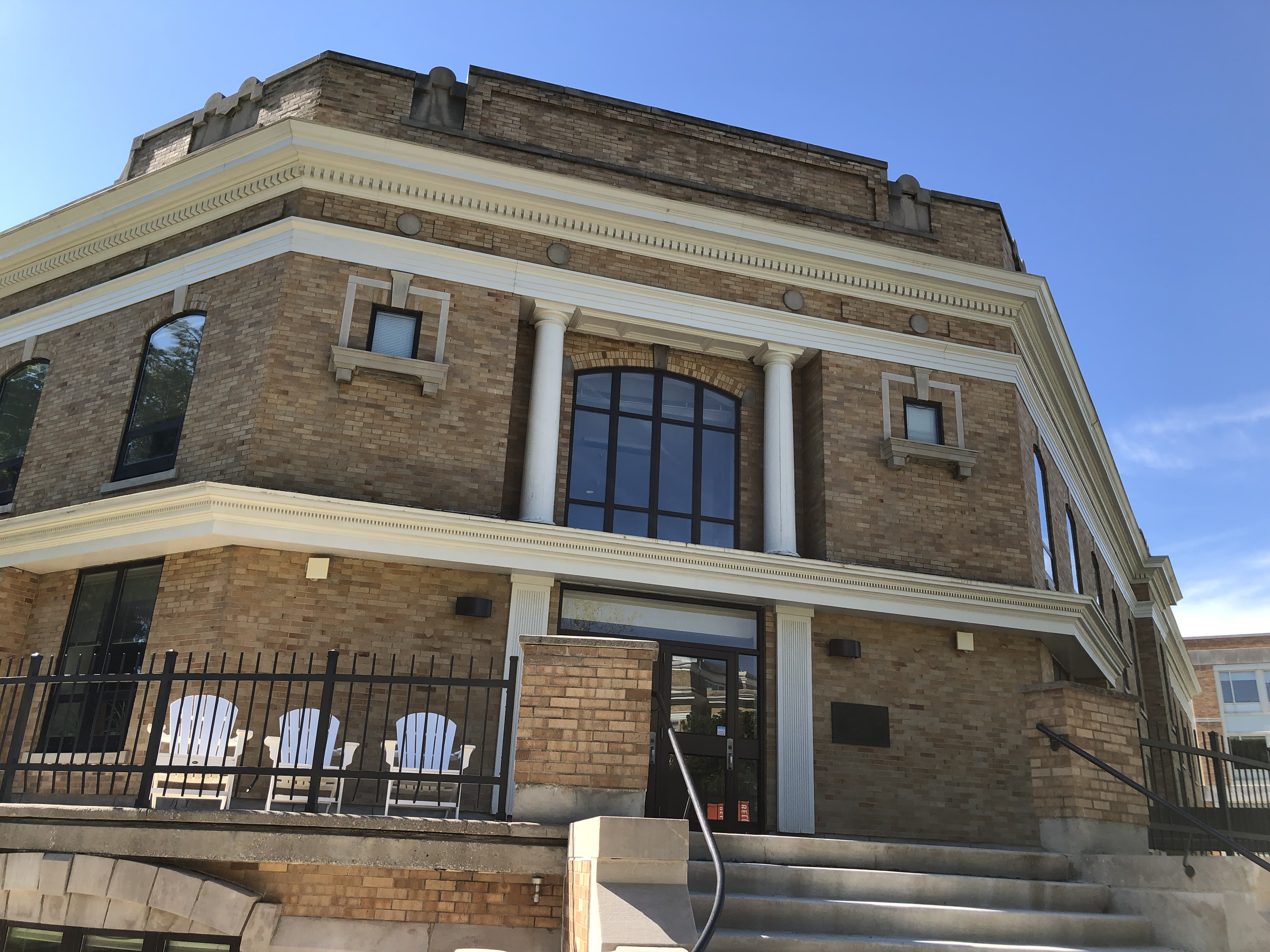
The Williams Hall entrance

The second building to be built on the campus, Williams Hall was built in 1915 and served as the first dormitory on campus, housing mostly female students. In 1964, the entire building was converted for use of the faculty of the Department of History, the Department of Political Science, and the Department of Sociology. At a time, Williams Hall also served as offices for the faculty of the Department of Philosophy (1968–71), the International Studies Program (1971–86), and the Social Work Program (1976–86). Currently, Williams Hall once again houses History, Sociology, and Political Science departments. Williams Hall was named in honor of the first president of the University, Homer B. Williams, in 1917. In 1966 the porch roof was removed from the building due to being in poor shape.

=== Centrex ===
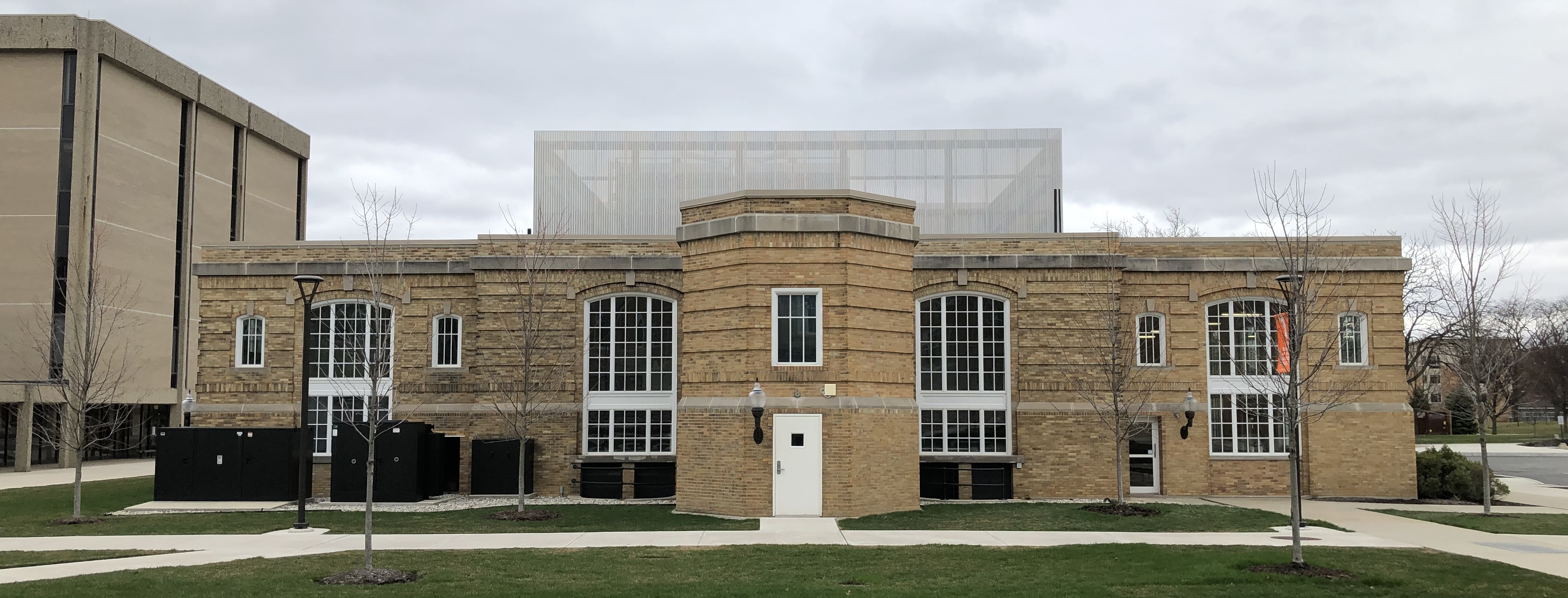
Centrex

Originally built as a general maintenance building in 1915. It was renovated in 1969 to serve as a telecommunications hub, and was named renamed to be the Centrex Building. The GTE backed telephone exchange installed in the building allowed the student telephone operators to handle more calls then the previous switchboard system, up to 6,500 telephone lines by July 1978. In 2016 the building was renovated to include a 1700-ton chiller plant and bus stop.

=== Moseley Hall ===
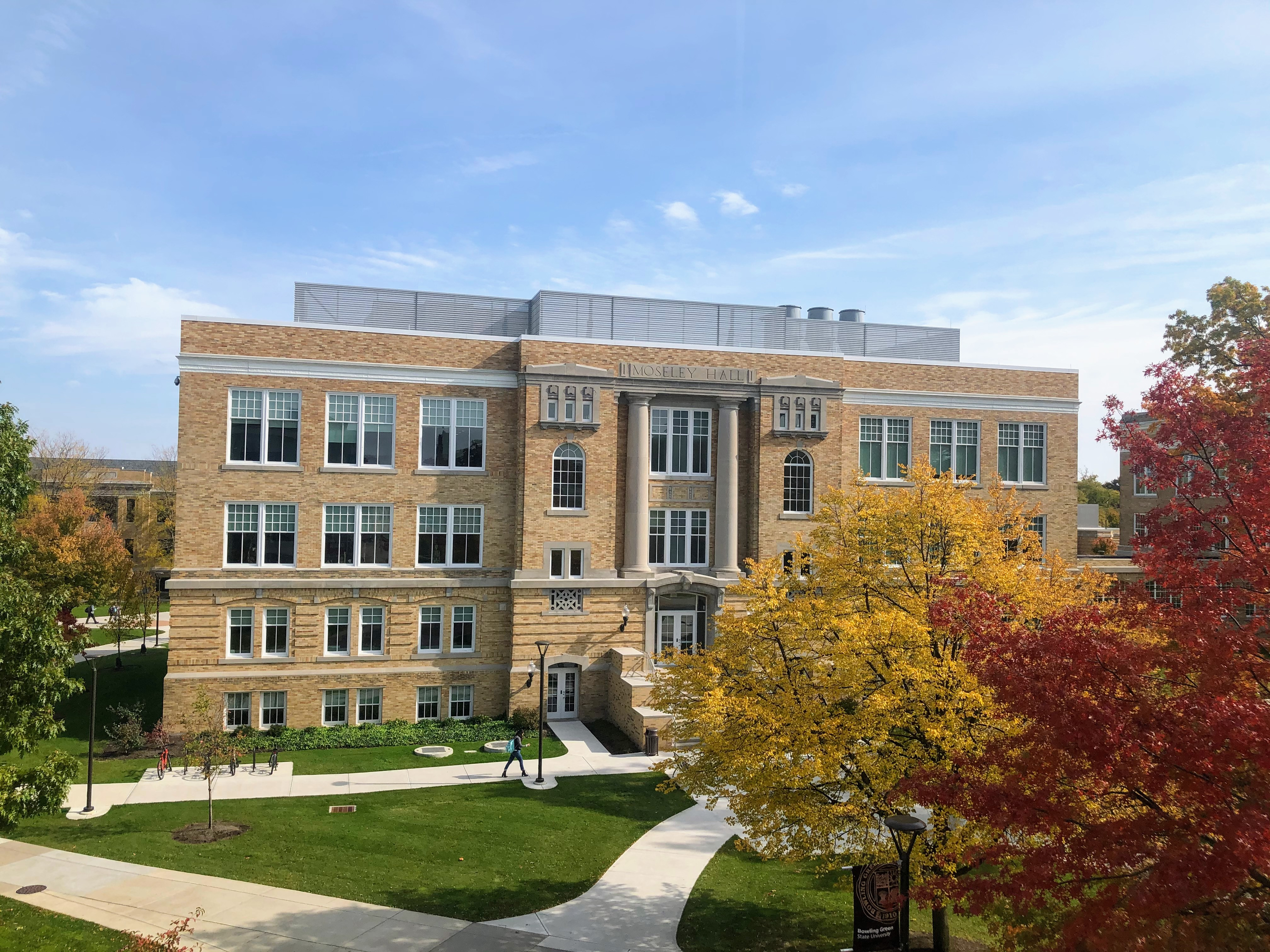
Moseley Hall

Built in 1916 as Science Hall, it was the main science building on campus until 1966. The first floor originally had space for cattle. Afterwards the building housed a variety of offices and the Moseley Museum. In the 1930s the pond behind the building was used by seniors to haze freshmen by dunking them in the water if they were unable to sing the school song. The building was renovated to become an interdisciplinary science center. The renovations earned the building an LEED gold certification.

=== Hanna Hall & The Maurer Center ===
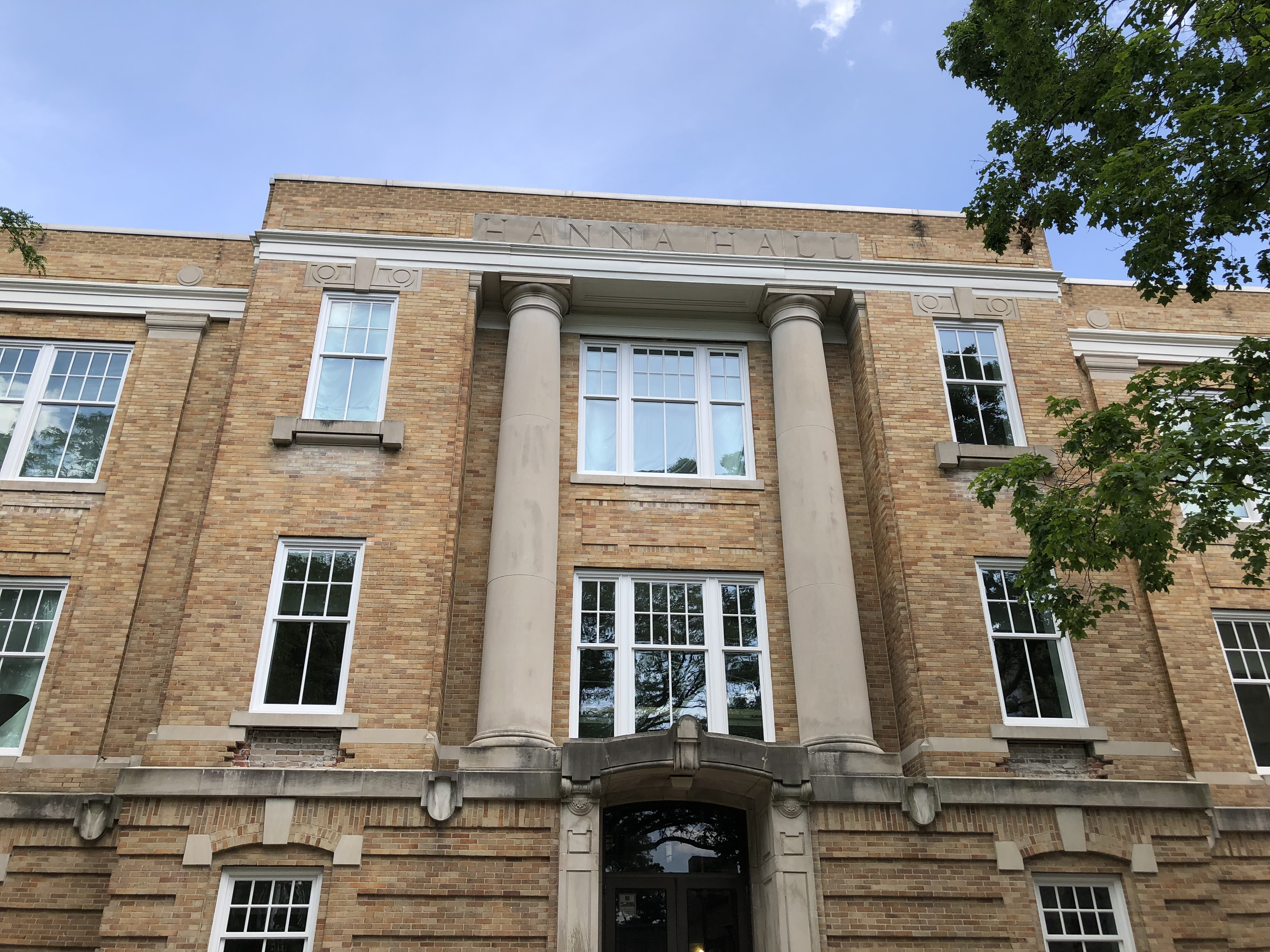
The Hanna Hall exterior during the addition of the Maurer Center.

Originally built to serve as a training school, construction was not finished until 1921 due to World War I. It was renamed to Hanna Hall in 1959 after Myrna Hanna, a member of the Ohio General Assembly who campaigned to turn the Normal colleges into state colleges. In 1996 the Gish Film Theater was opened in the hall, named after Dorothy and Lillian Gish. The film theater was later relocated to the Bowen Thompson Student Union. The building was renamed to the Maurer Center when it began undergoing renovation. The renovation changed the number of classrooms in the building to seven reconfigurable classrooms, as well as the addition of a large atrium.

=== Shatzel Hall ===
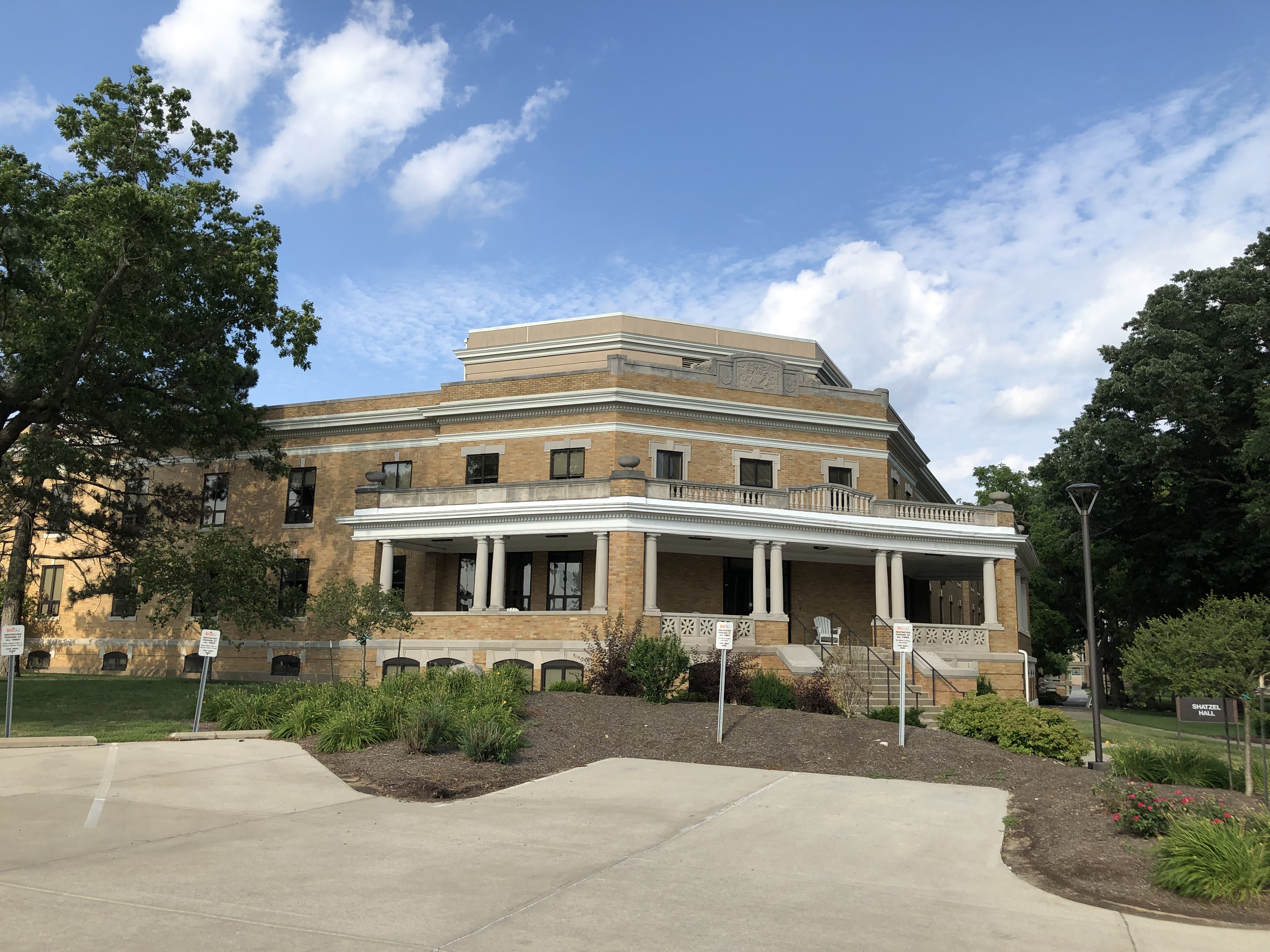
Shatzel Hall

Originally built as a dormitory in 1923, it was renovated in 1939 to add an infirmary and renovated again in 1966 and 1990 to become an academic building. As of 2019 the building houses the Departments of Ethnic Studies, Philosophy, Women's Gender and Sexuality Studies, and World Languages and Cultures.

=== McFall Center ===
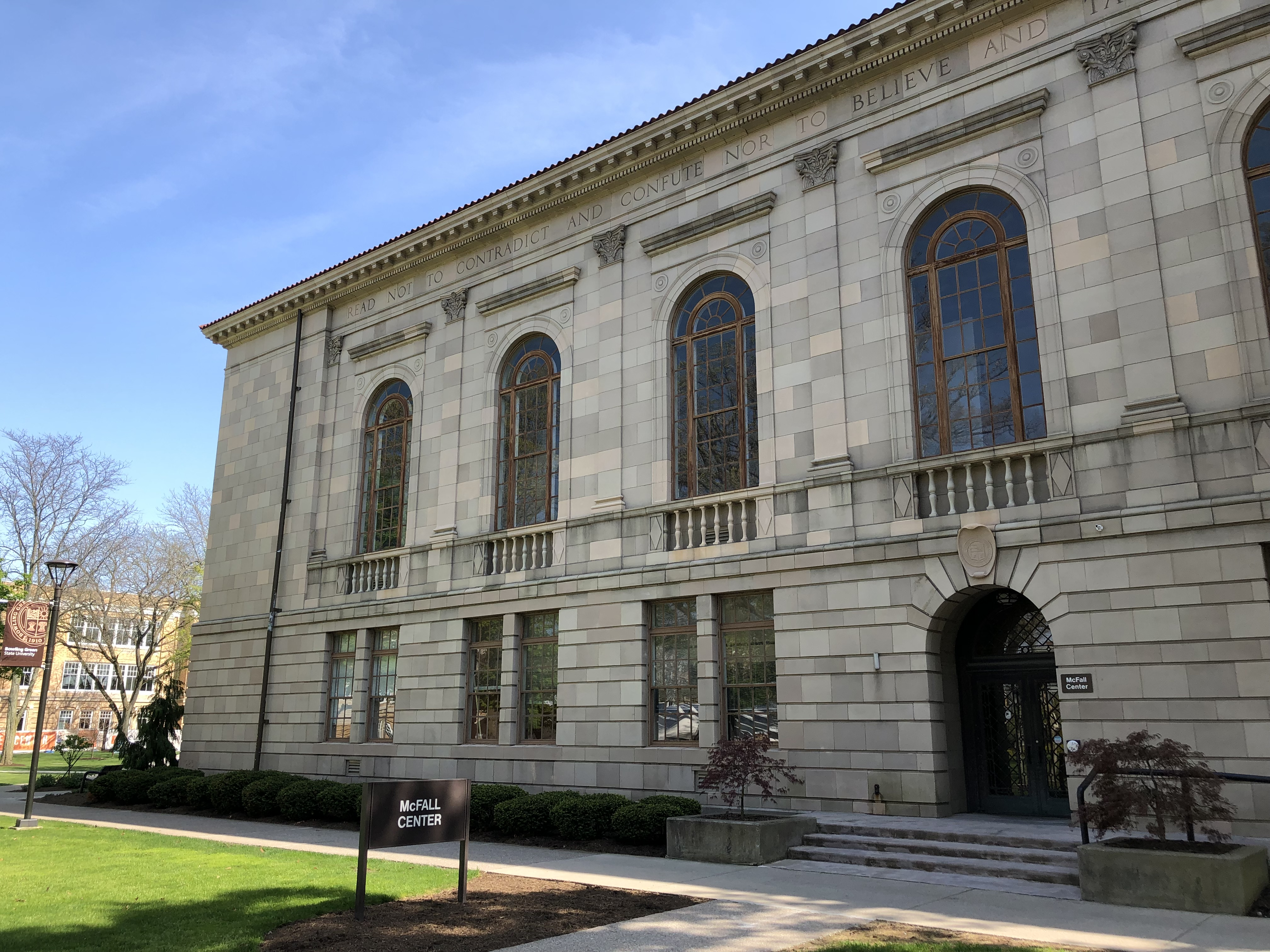
The McFall center

Built in 1927 at a cost of $345,000, originally served as the University's first main library until the construction of Jerome Library in 1967. As an academic library, McFall Center housed over 45,000 volumes of books as well as research space and a seminar room. In 1967, the library was transformed into office space for faculty for the Department of Speech and Psychology as well as the Faculty Senate. McFall Center currently houses the Office of the University President, an assembly room, and the Faculty Senate. The McFall Center is named after Kenneth H. McFall, a former dean of the College of Liberal Arts and was dedicated in 1976.

=== Hayes Hall ===
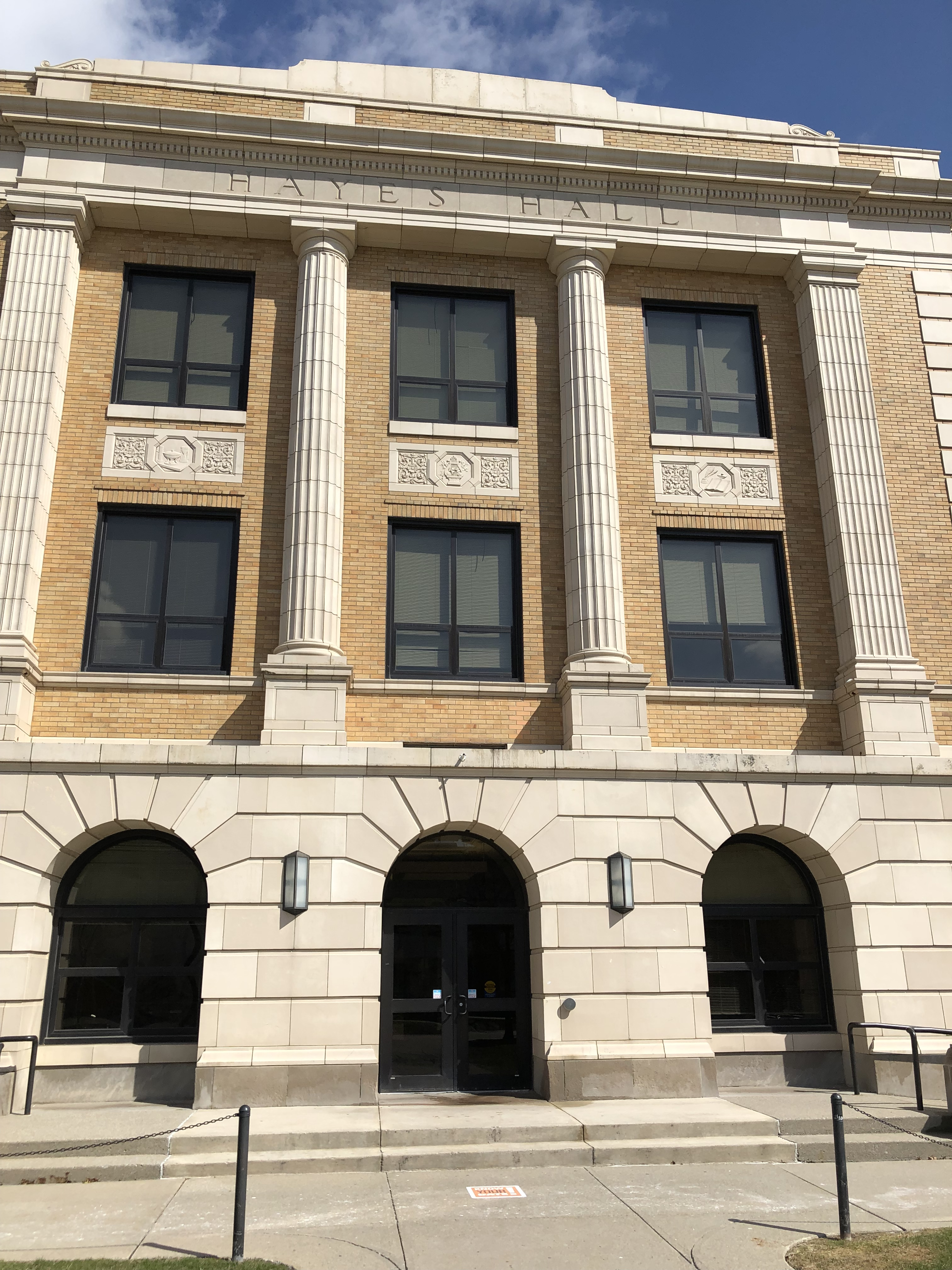
Hayes Hall

Built as a Practical Arts building in 1931 at a cost of almost $250,000. In 1959 it was named after President Rutherford B. Hayes and Lucy Webb Hayes. In 1992 computer services and Computer Science was centralized in this building. The Center for Women and Gender Equity was moved to this building in 2018.

=== Kohl Hall ===
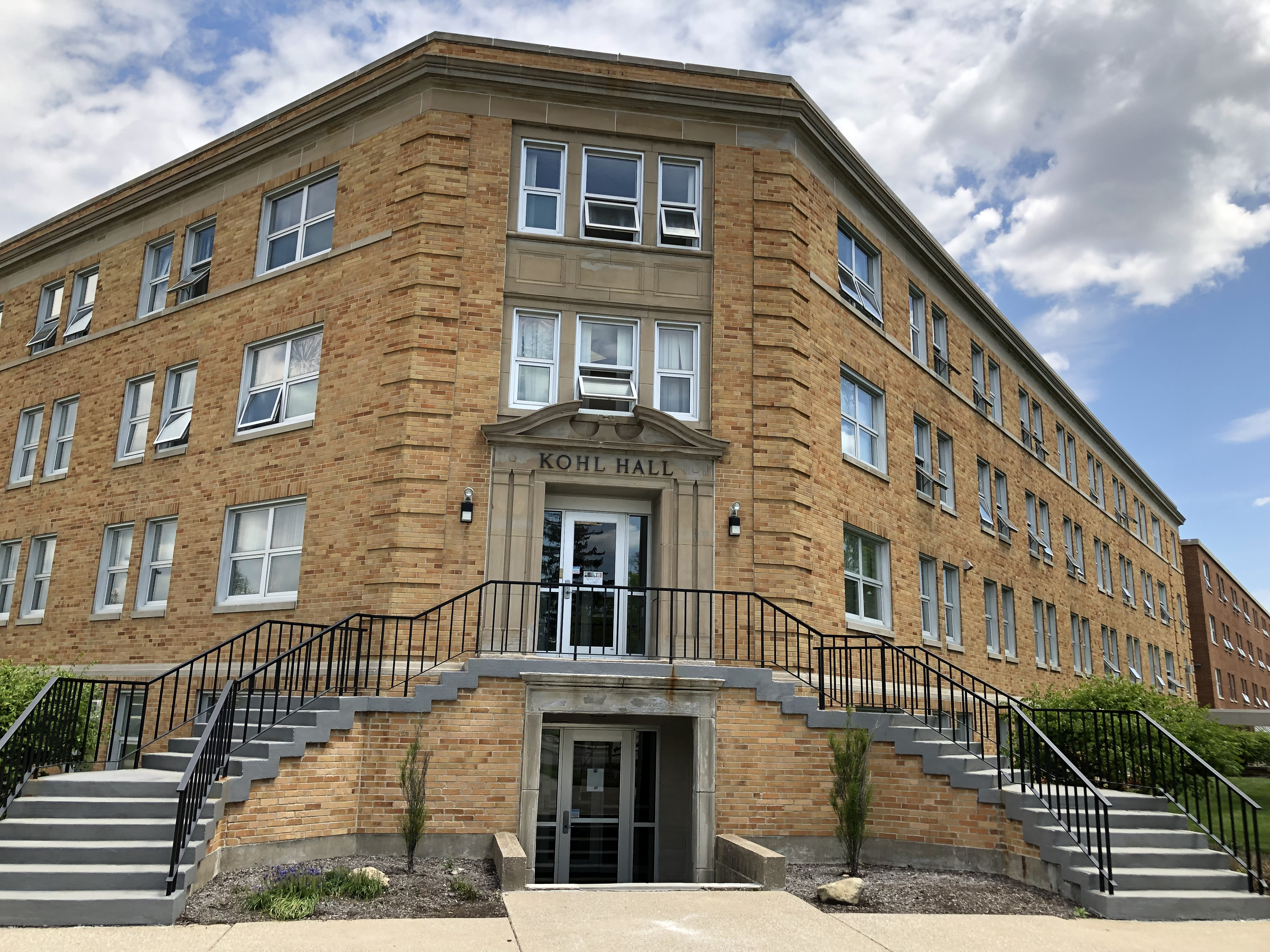
Kohl Hall

Built in 1939, it was the first Men's dormitory on campus. It was used as housing for members of the V-12 Navy College Training Program during World War II, and an annex was added to expand capacity in 1964. The hall continues to operate as a Co-Ed residence hall as of 2019.

=== Campus Operations Building ===
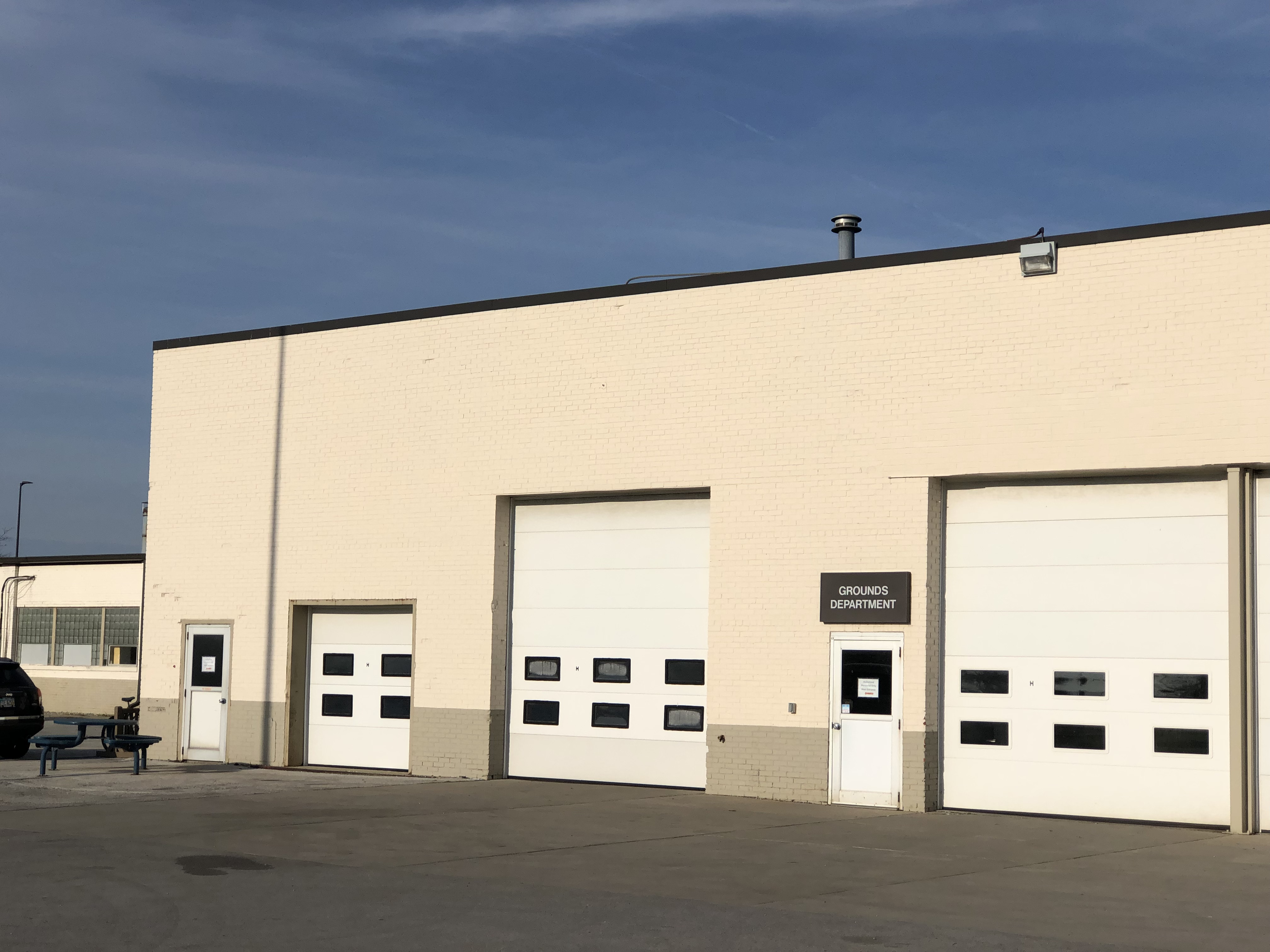
Campus Operations Building

Built in 1946. Hosts various grounds services.

=== Overman Hall ===
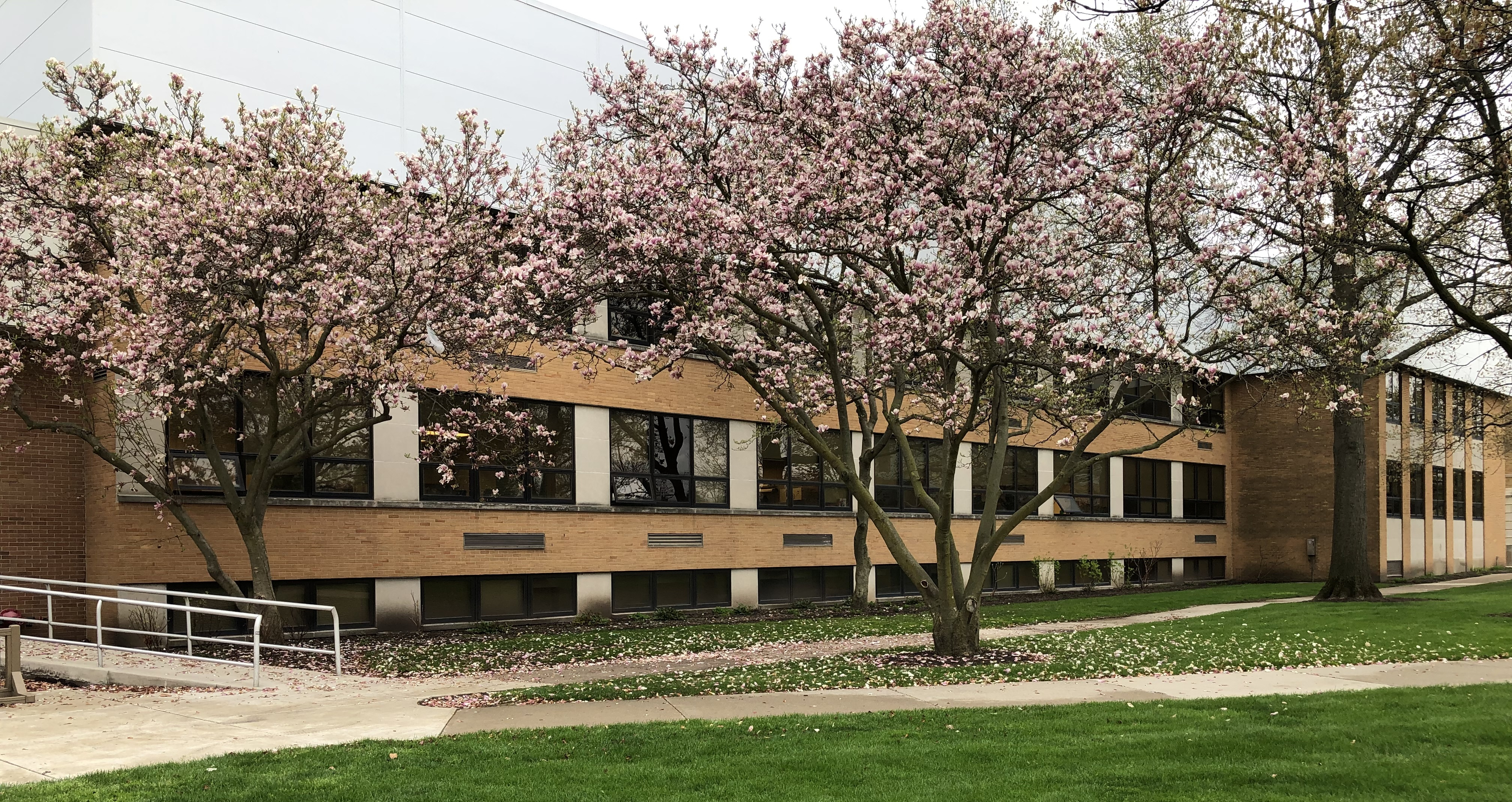
Overman Hall

Built in 1951 at a cost of $850,000 to host Physics, Geology, and Math. A seismograph was installed in the basement in 1963. In 1991 renovations on the building were completed following a 2 to 8 pounds (0.91 to 3.63 kg) mercury spill that took two months to clean up. A newer seismic station was installed in 1999. The building currently hosts the Center for Photochemical Sciences.

=== Prout Chapel ===
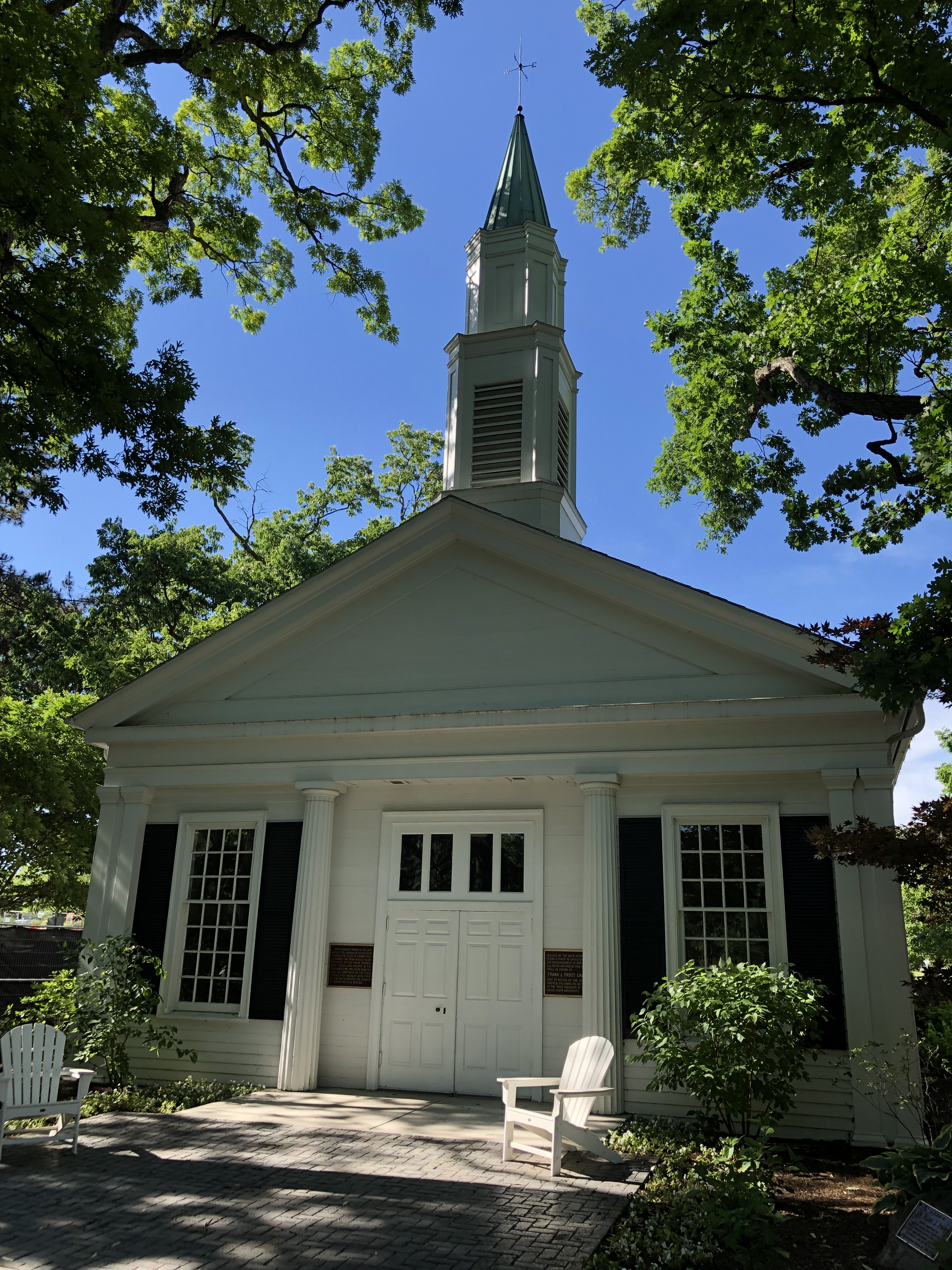
Prout Chapel

Built in 1951 at a cost of $76,112 for use as a place of worship and for ceremonies. As of 2019 the chapel primarily serves as a wedding venue. Has a small memorial plaque to the students who died in WWI and WWII. Hosts a portion of the annual Winter Wheat writing festival.

=== Founders Hall ===
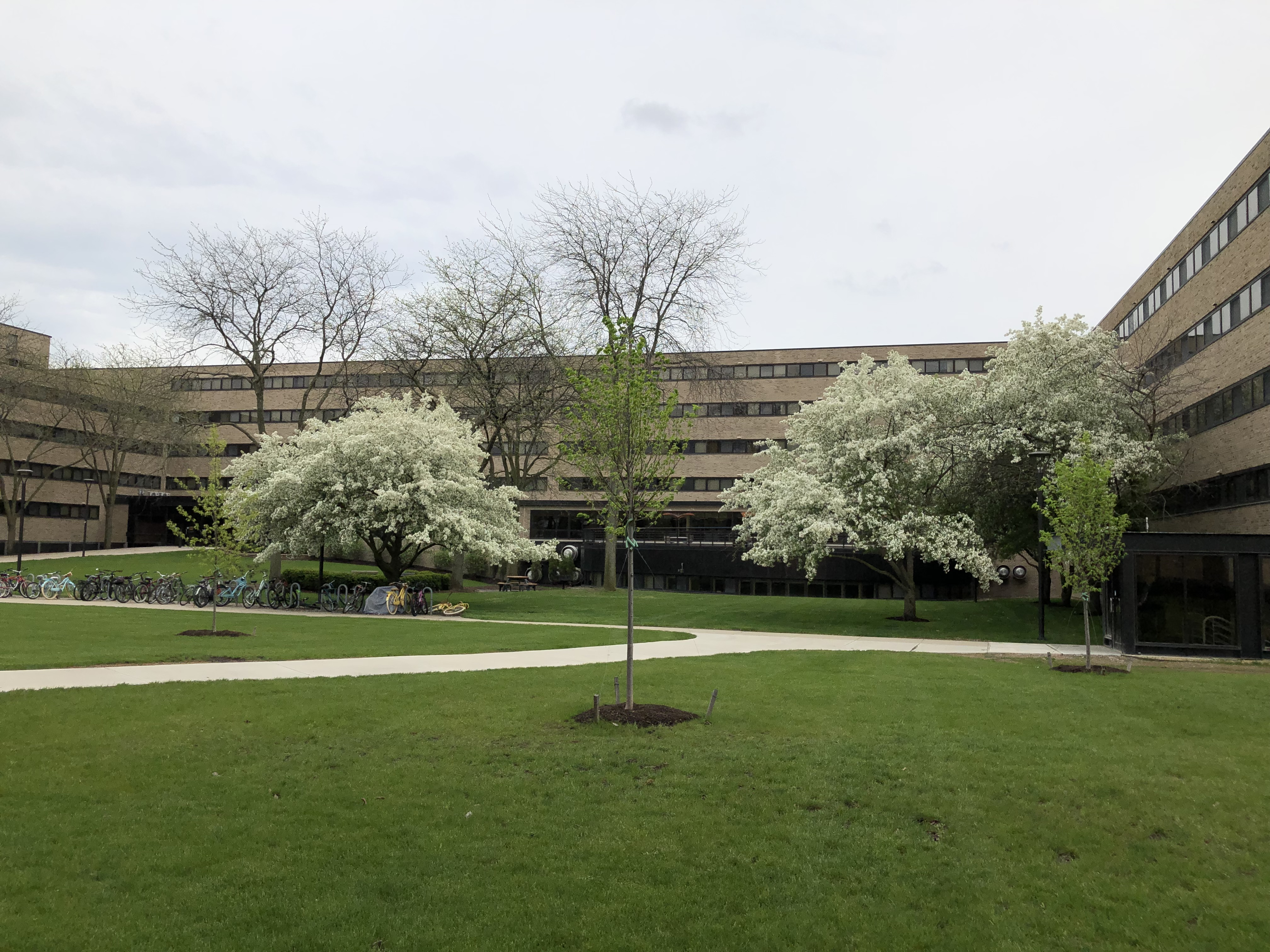
Founders Hall

Originally built as a men's dormitory in 1957 for 2.753 million dollars, a now closed non-alcoholic nightclub was added in 1988. In 1993 the residence hall was renovated to use electronic personal entry devices instead of keys. As of 2019 it serves as a co-ed Residence Hall and Honors College.

=== Bowen Thompson Student Union ===
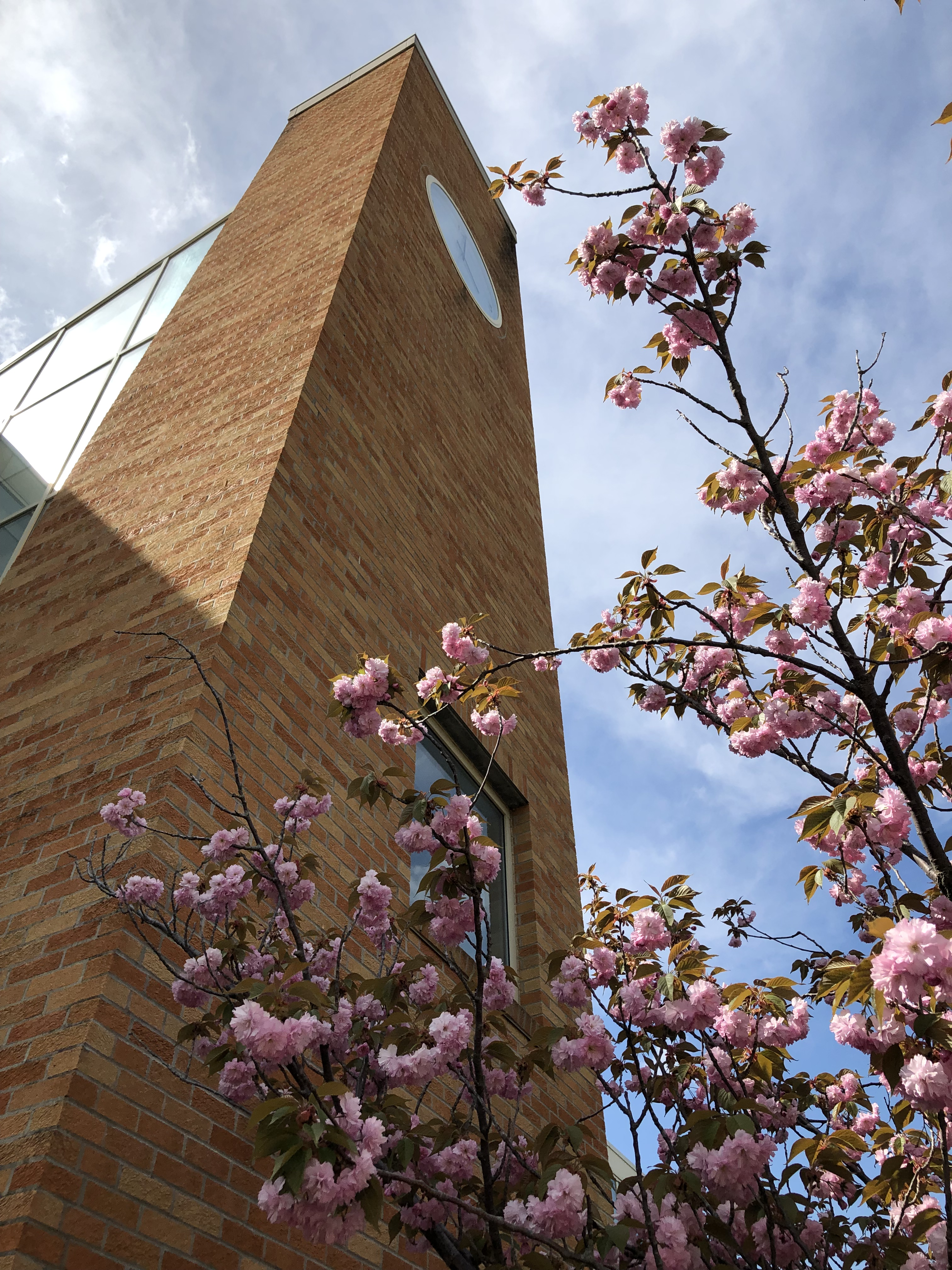
The BTSU Clocktower

Built at a cost of $2.75 million in 1958 to serve as a student union and renovated in 2002. Then United States Ambassador to the United Nations, George H. W. Bush, gave a speech to 100 people in the Grand Ballroom on March 2, 1972, where he discussed Chinese representation in the United Nations. The event was shortly followed by a speech in the Ballroom by minor presidential candidate Pat Paulsen on March 8, 1972, which resulted in a full house.

Ray Bradbury held a speech in the grand ballroom on April 19, 1982.

=== Kuhlin Center ===
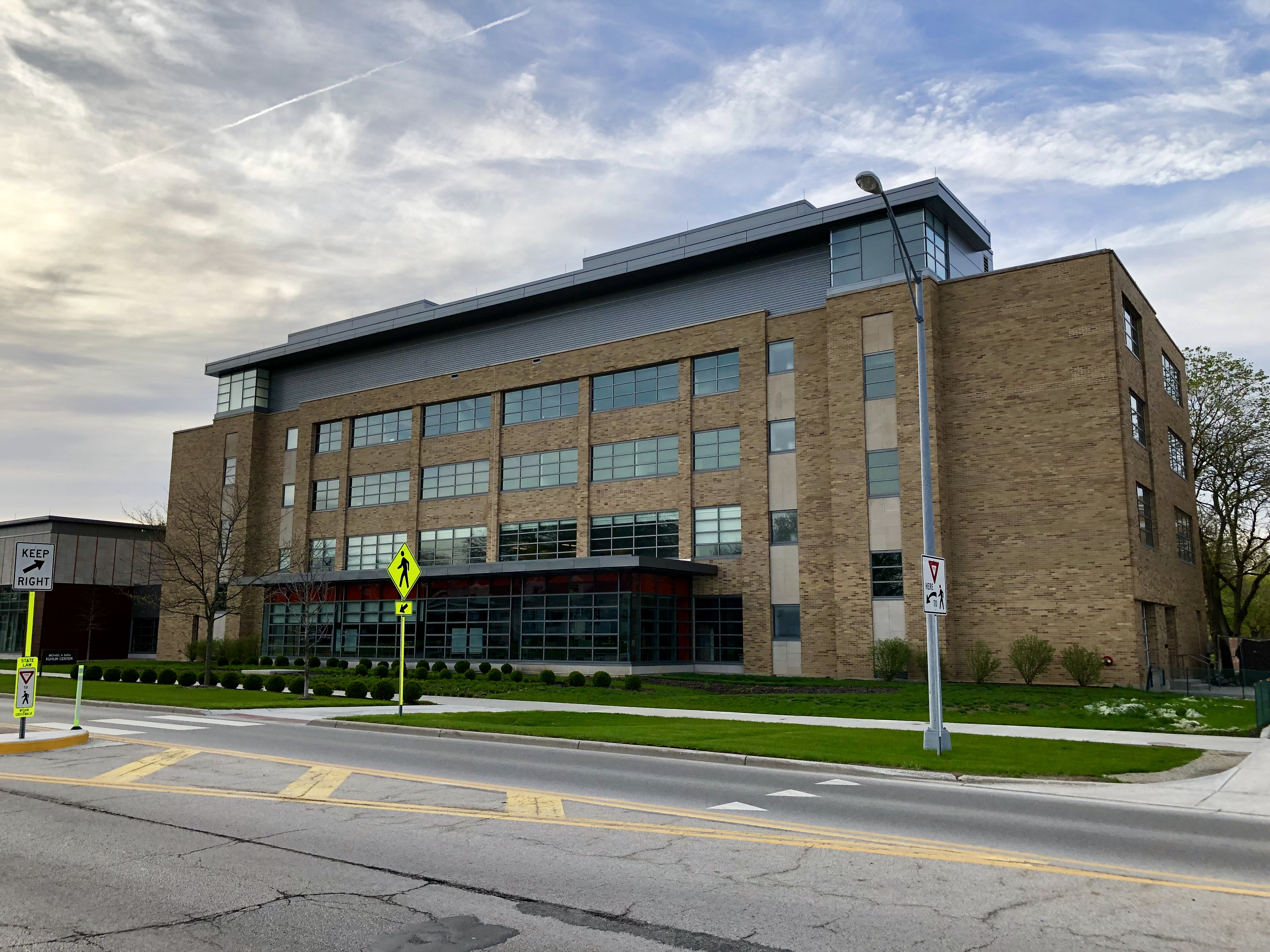
Kuhlin Center

Built as South Hall in 1959 at a cost of $774,000 for use as a general academic building. In 2016 renovations were completed to form the Michael & Sara Kuhlin Center to house Journalism and Media departments, as well as studios for WBGU (FM) and WFAL Falcon Radio. The renovations earned the building an LEED gold rating in part due to improvements in water usage, and a reflective roof to mitigate the urban heat island effect.

=== Conklin Hall ===
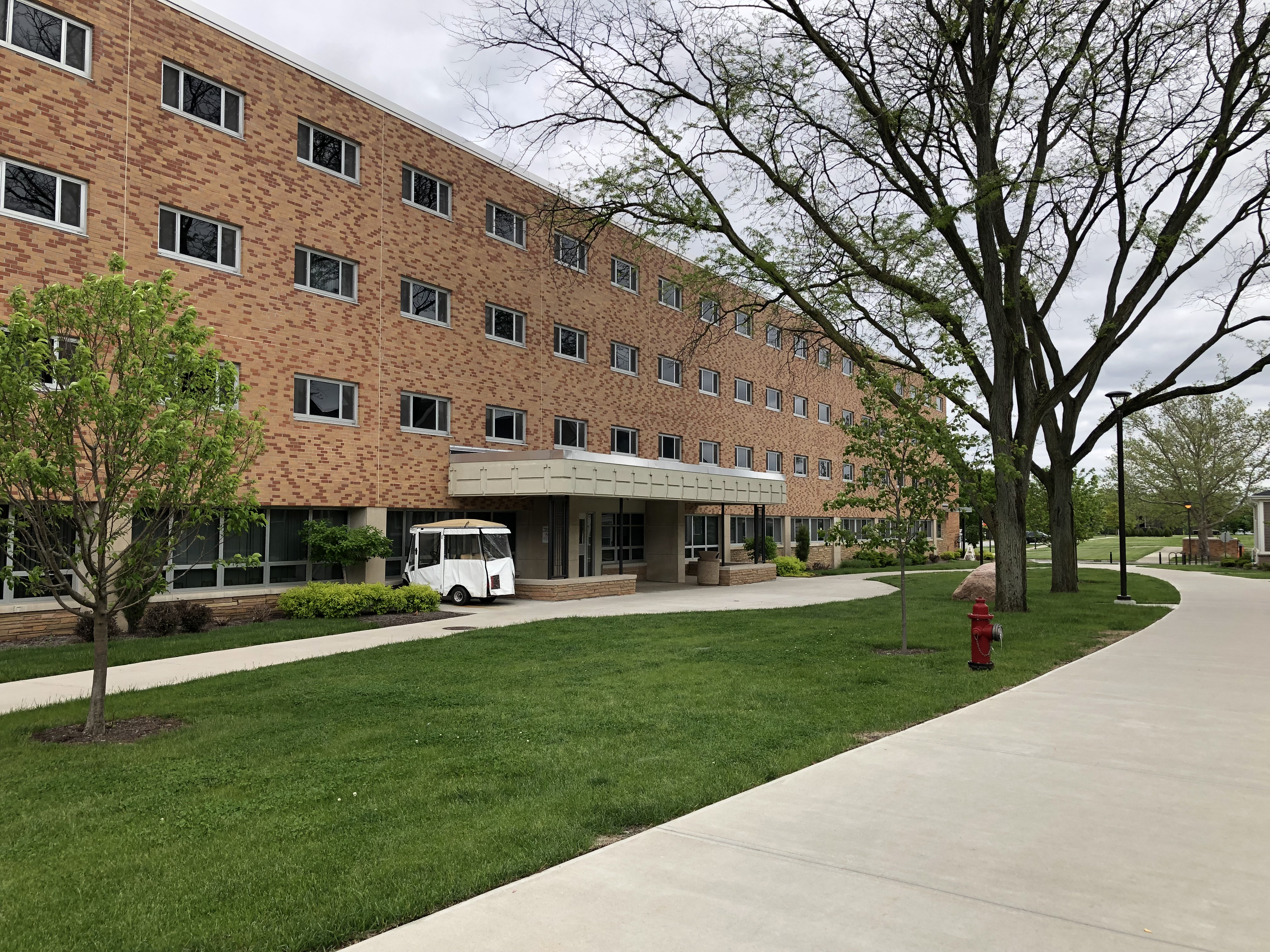
Conklin Hall

Originally constructed in 1960 as a men's residence quadrangle where different governing policies such as self-governance of students could be tested. The hall was named after Arch B. Conklin, a former dean of students. As of 2019 only the north portion of the quadrangle remains, and is in use as a co-ed residence hall.

=== Slater Family Ice Arena ===
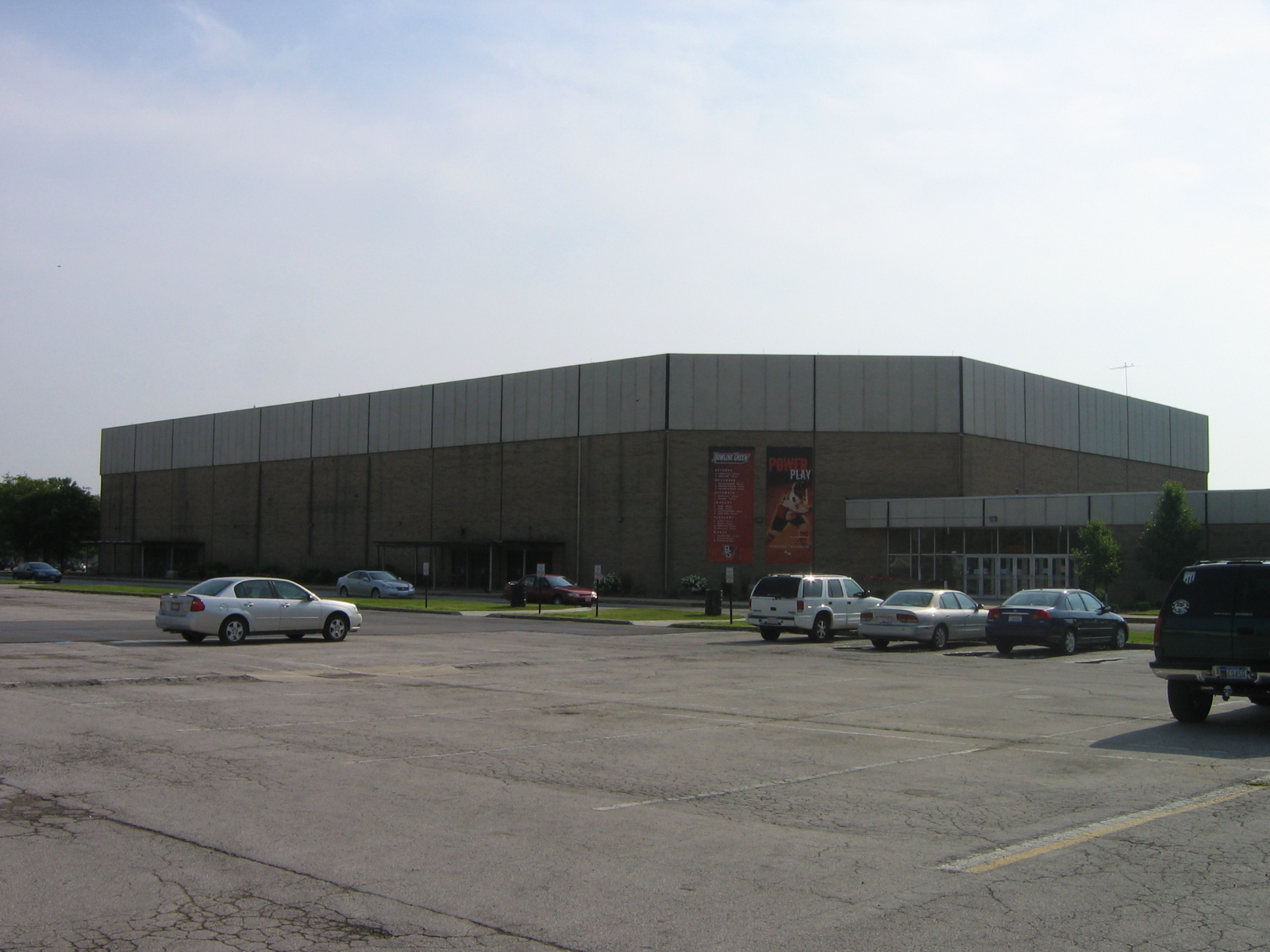
The Slater Family Ice Arena

The dual rink Ice Arena was built in 1960 at a cost of $1.8 million. In 2006 solar panels were installed on the roof. Olympic gold medalist Scott Hamilton used this arena to practice early in his life. In 2016, $2 million was given for renovations, and the arena was renamed after the Slater Family.

=== Memorial Hall ===
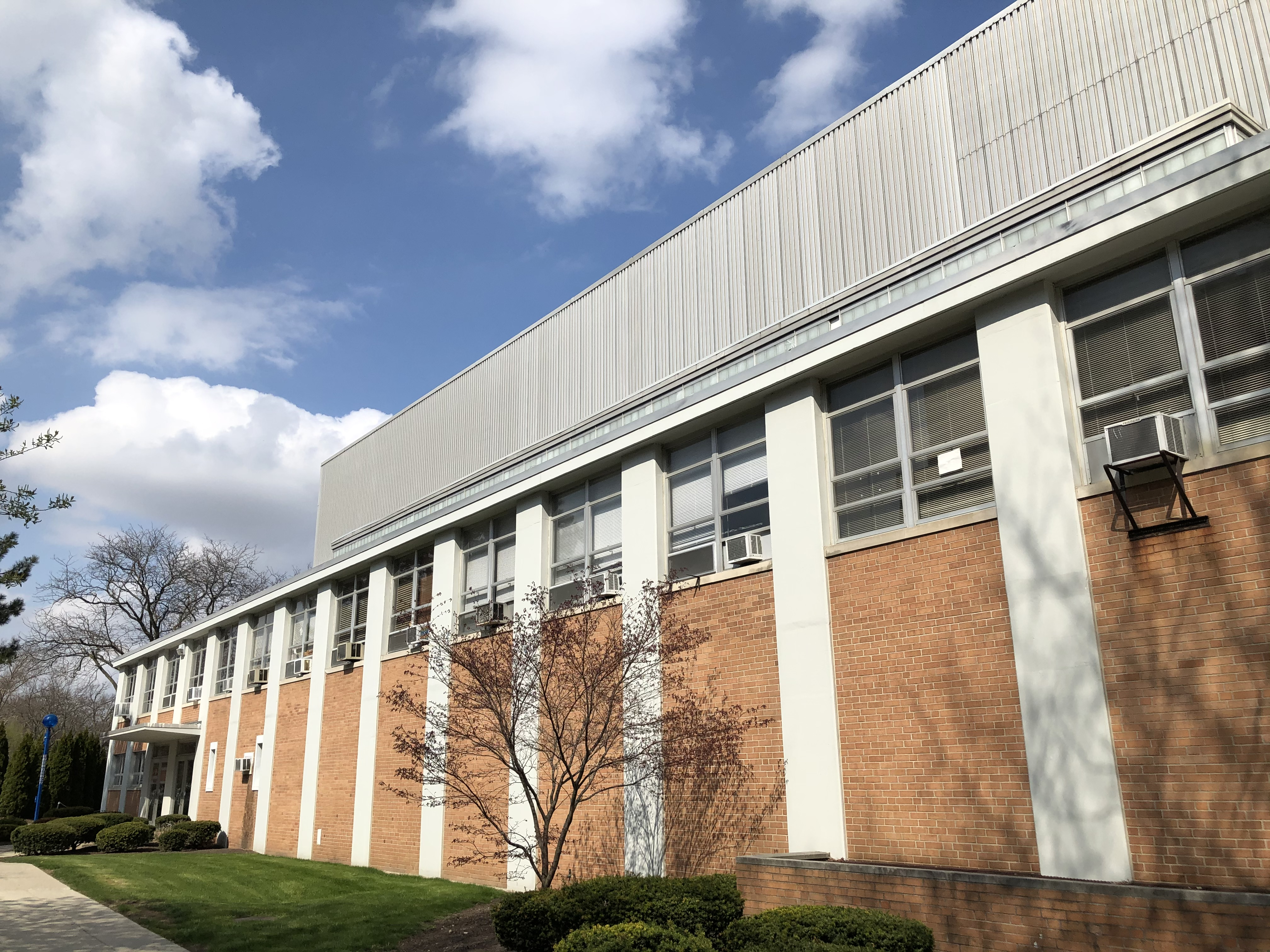
Memorial Hall / Anderson Arena

Built in 1960 at a cost of $1.2 million, the name Memorial Hall was chosen to honor those who lost their lives in war. From 1963 to 2011 it was the primary basketball venue of the university. Aerosmith performed here on October 12, 1974. President Gerald Ford held a rally here in 1976. President Ronald Reagan held a campaign rally here on September 26, 1984 with an attendance of 4,000. Sarah Palin held a 5,500 person rally at Anderson Arena on October 29, 2008. Gavin DeGraw, Michelle Branch, and Red Wanting Blue performed here in the 2010 centennial concert.

=== McDonald Hall ===
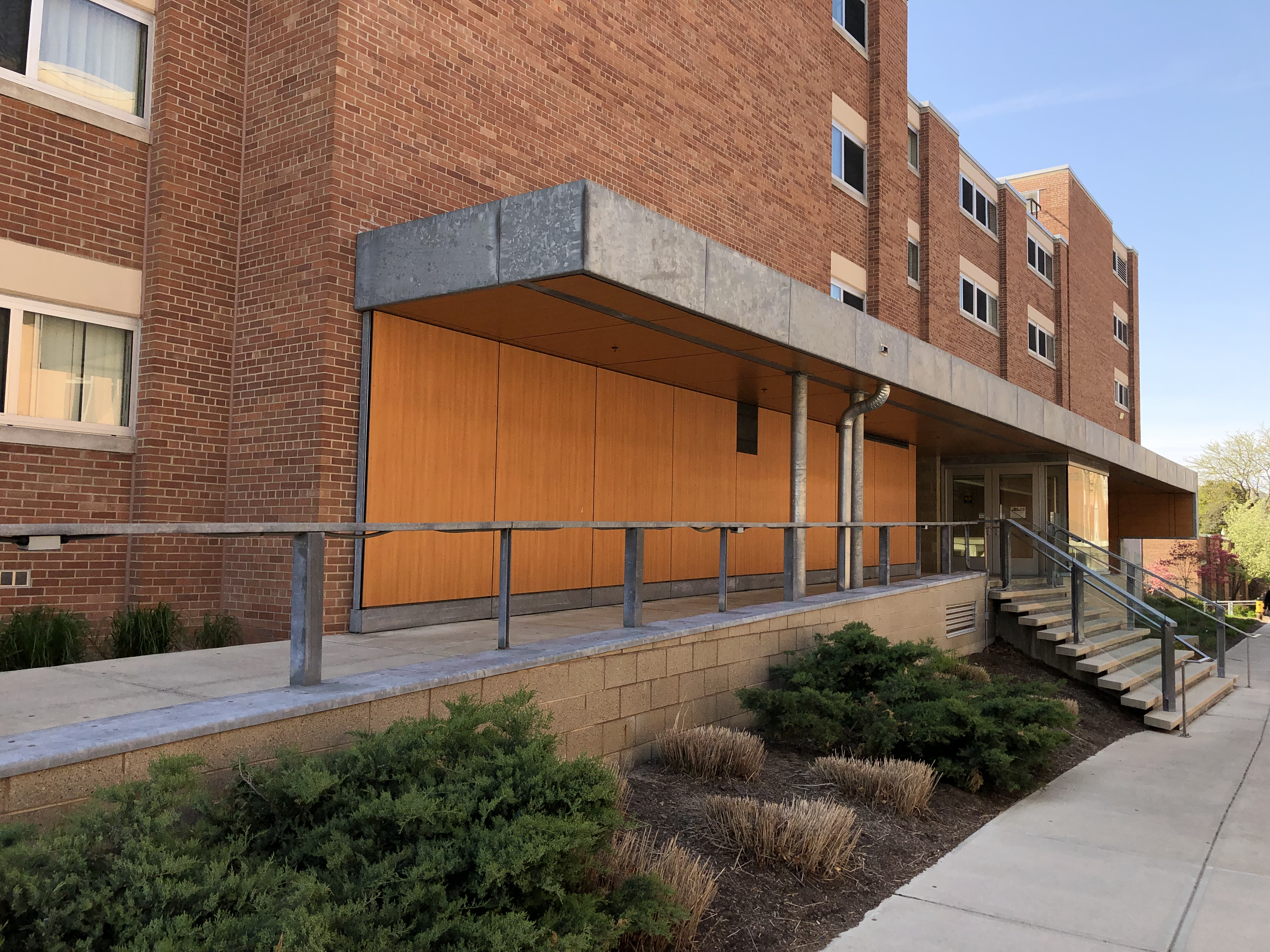
McDonald Hall

Built as a women's Residence Hall in 1962, it was named after former university president Ralph W. McDonald and his wife Athleen T, McDonald. The hall is the namesake of early webcomic Mac Hall from when its artist Ian McConville was living there. As of 2019, the hall operates as a Co-Ed residence hall. In Summer of 2023, it closed for renovations where it reopened in Fall of 2024.

=== Fine Arts Building ===
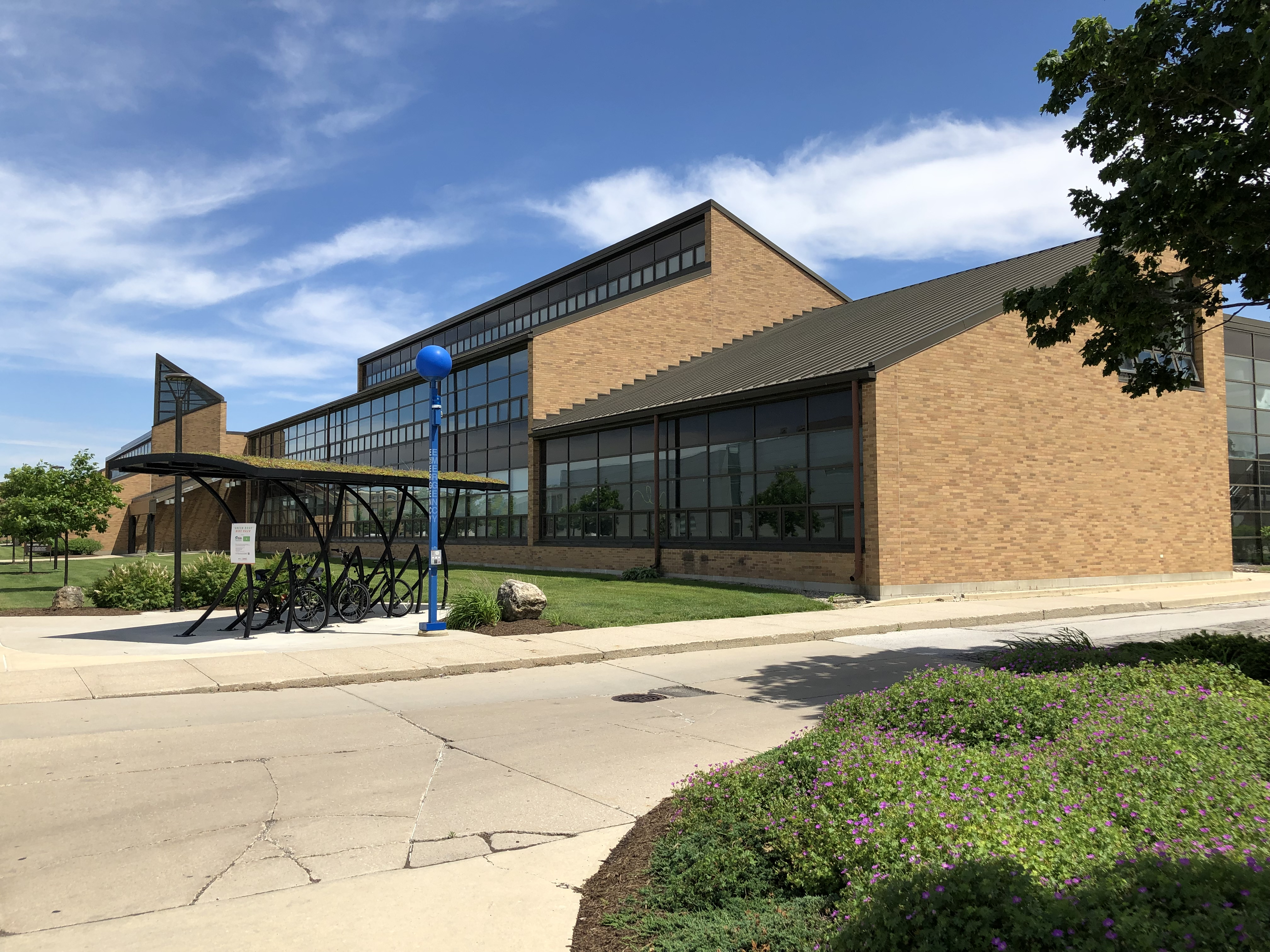
Fine Arts Building

Built in 1962 at a cost of $409,000, in 1992 it was expanded into a complex to centralize fine arts on campus. In 1991 Dr. Hiroko Nakamoto sponsored the creation of a Japanese tea ceremony room in the building. On October 8, 1992, a $9.8 million addition that added additional space and modernized equipment. The Complex hosts a number of galleries. Contains a glass artwork "A Flow of Color" by Dominick Labino. The building facilities include computer labs a video production studio, a photography studio, a sculpture studio with crane and sandblasting facilities, a jewelry studio with facilities for soldering, metal-forming, aluminum anodization and copper electroplating, A glass studio with hot and cold shops, a ceramics studio with eight kilns, Printmaking studios with facilities for Intaglio, lithography, and a darkroom, A drawing studio, A painting studio, and the Center for Advanced Visualization and Education.

=== Administration Building ===
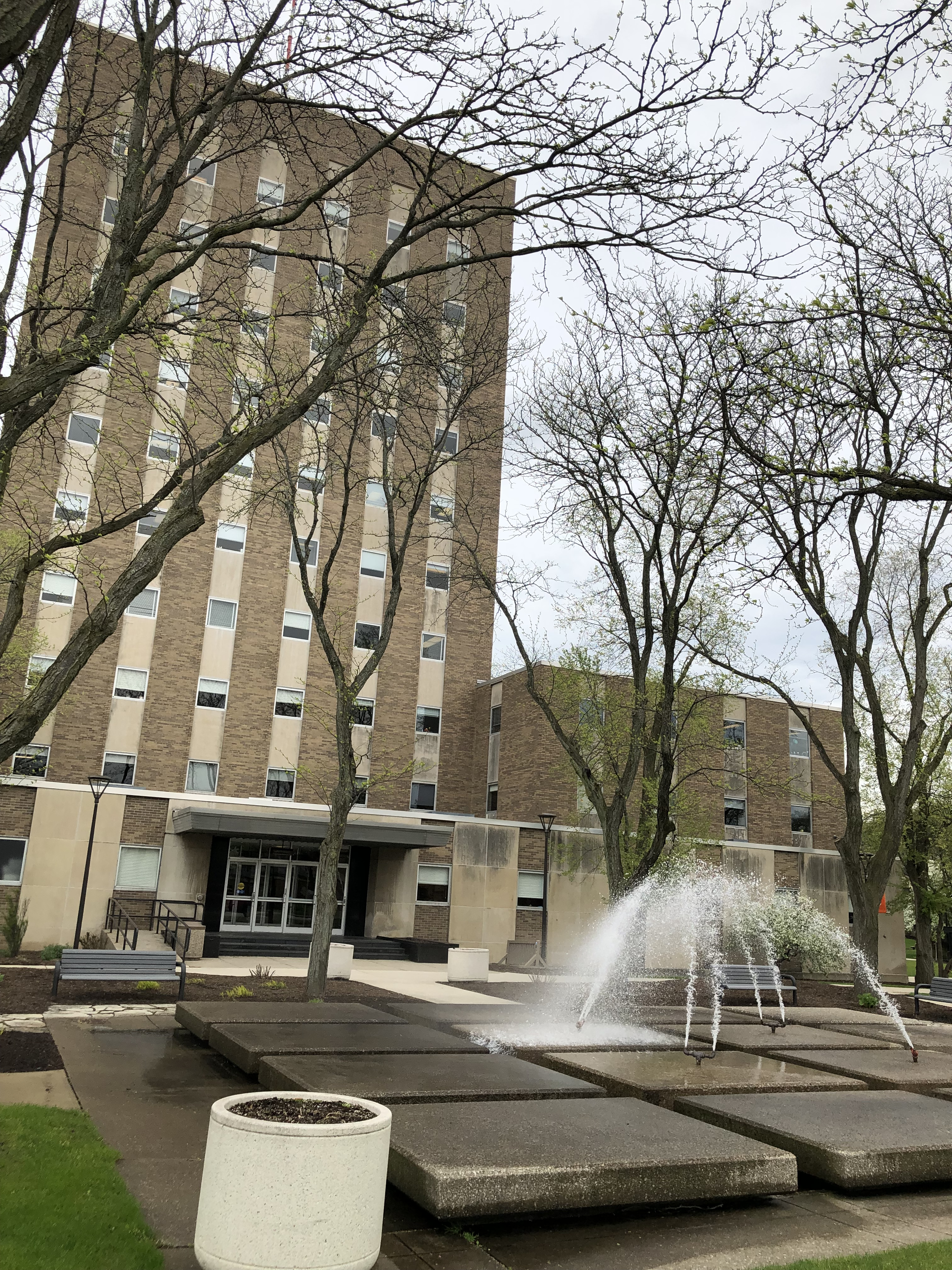
Admin Building

As the student population increased during the 1940s and 1950s, the administration population also boomed calling for the need of new office spaces. This need was relieved with the construction of the $1 million, ten-story Administration Building in 1963. The seventh floor of the building housed the first university computer in 1963, an IBM 1620. Most of the administrative offices were moved into the Administration Building after its completion including the offices of the President (until 1977), Bursar, Housing, Admissions, Registrar, Academic Deans, Provost, and Dean of Students. The Administration Building currently houses the offices of the Bursar, Registration, and the College of Arts and Sciences, among others. The building was set to be demolished by the year 2017 and have its offices be moved to new locations to better serve the students. However this course of action had been postponed, and it would not be until 2021 when demolition work was confirmed. Demolition began in November 2021.

=== Tucker Center for Telecommunications ===
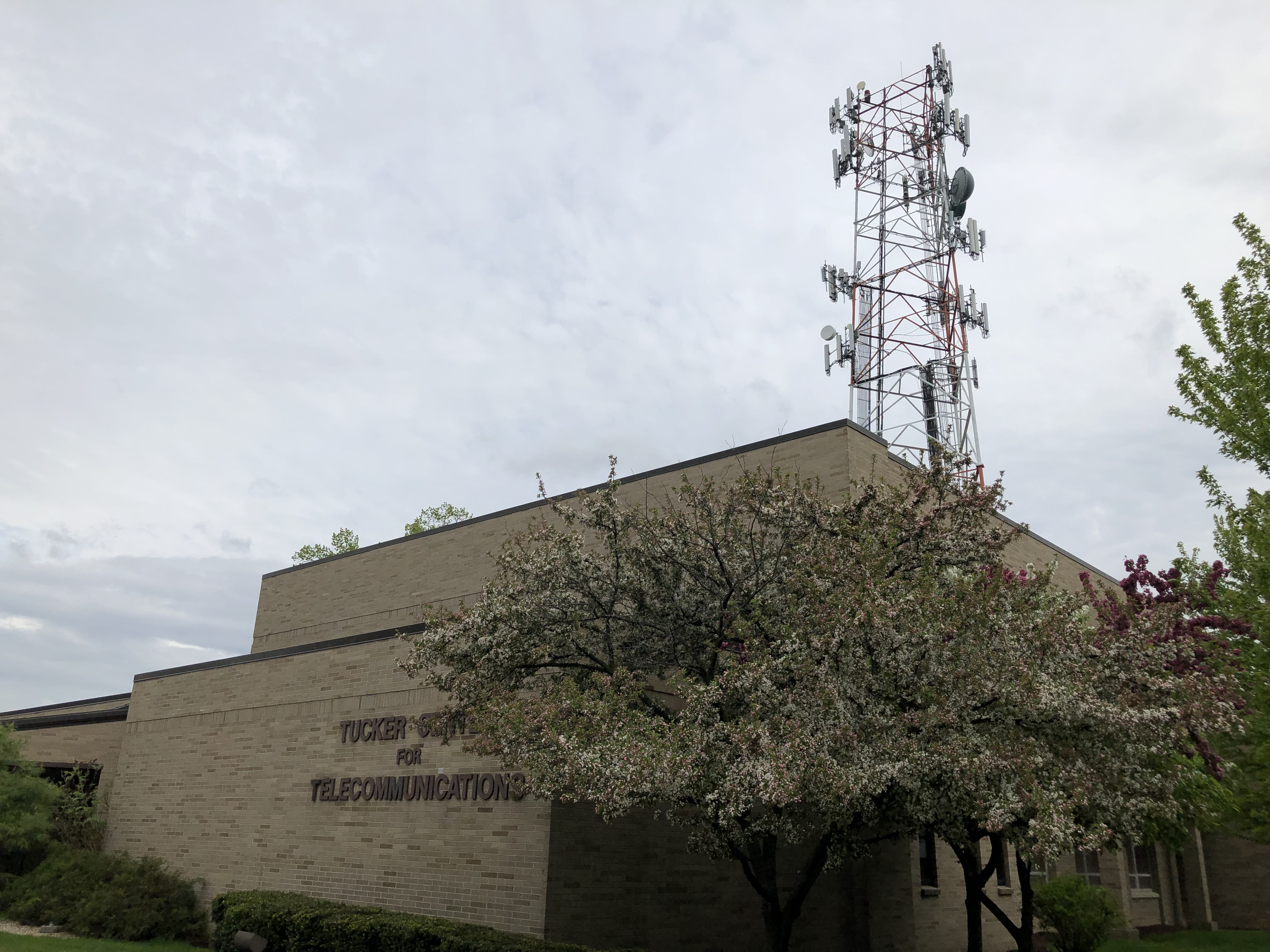
Tucker Center for Telecommunications

Built at a cost of $400,000 in 1965 and soon became host to WBGU-TV which moved from South Hall. The center was expanded in 1995 at a cost of $1.4 million to increase office space and add equipment to digitize their analog tapes.

=== Kreischer Complex ===
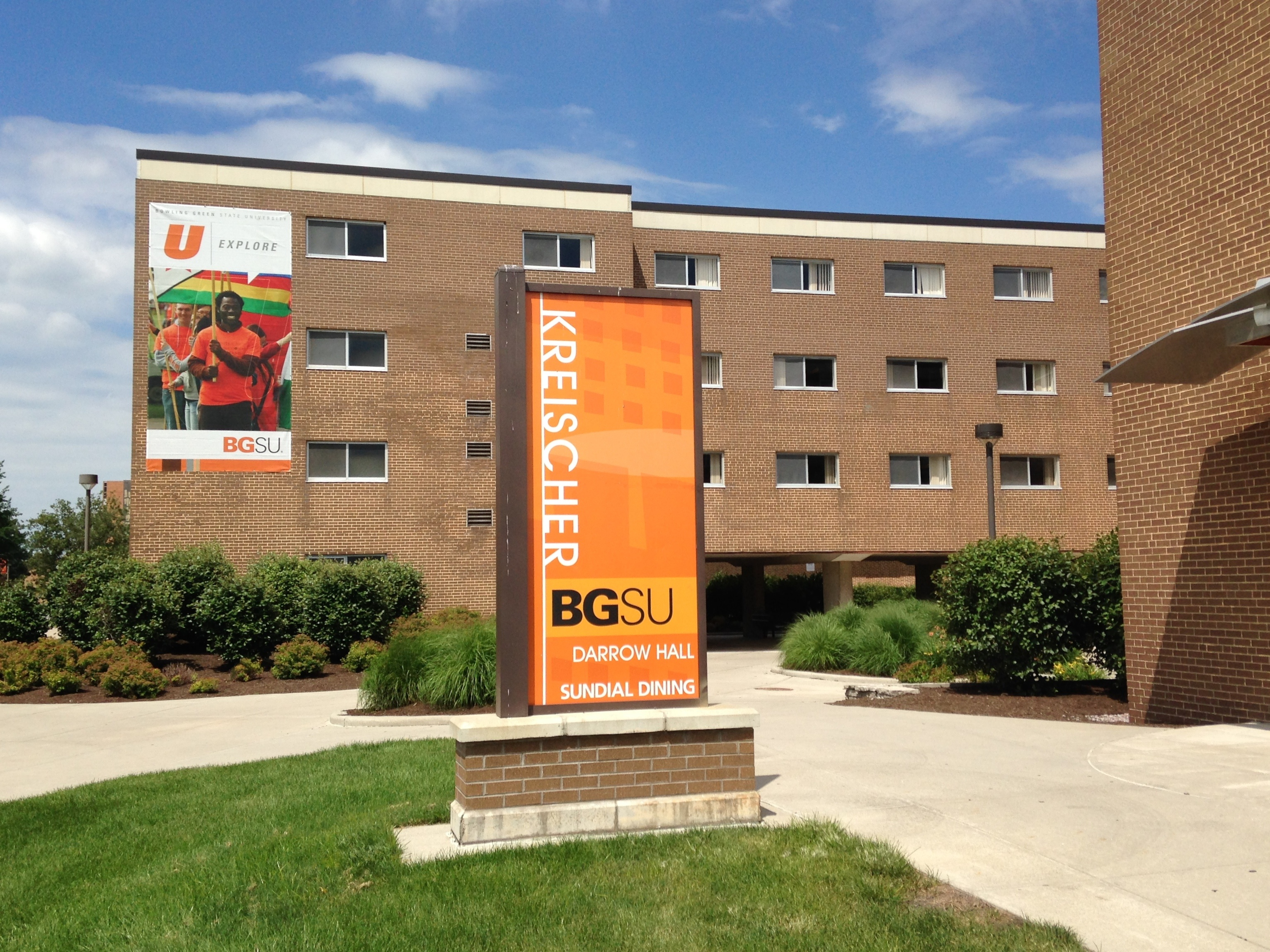
Darrow Hall of the Kreischer Complex

Built at a cost of $6.5 million in 1966, in 1971 it offered the first Co-Ed residence hall on campus. As of 2019, the building operates as a 4 co-ed residence halls (Ashley Hall, Batchelder Hall, Compton Hall, and Darrow Hall), a convenience store, and the Sundial food court.

=== Doyt Perry Stadium ===
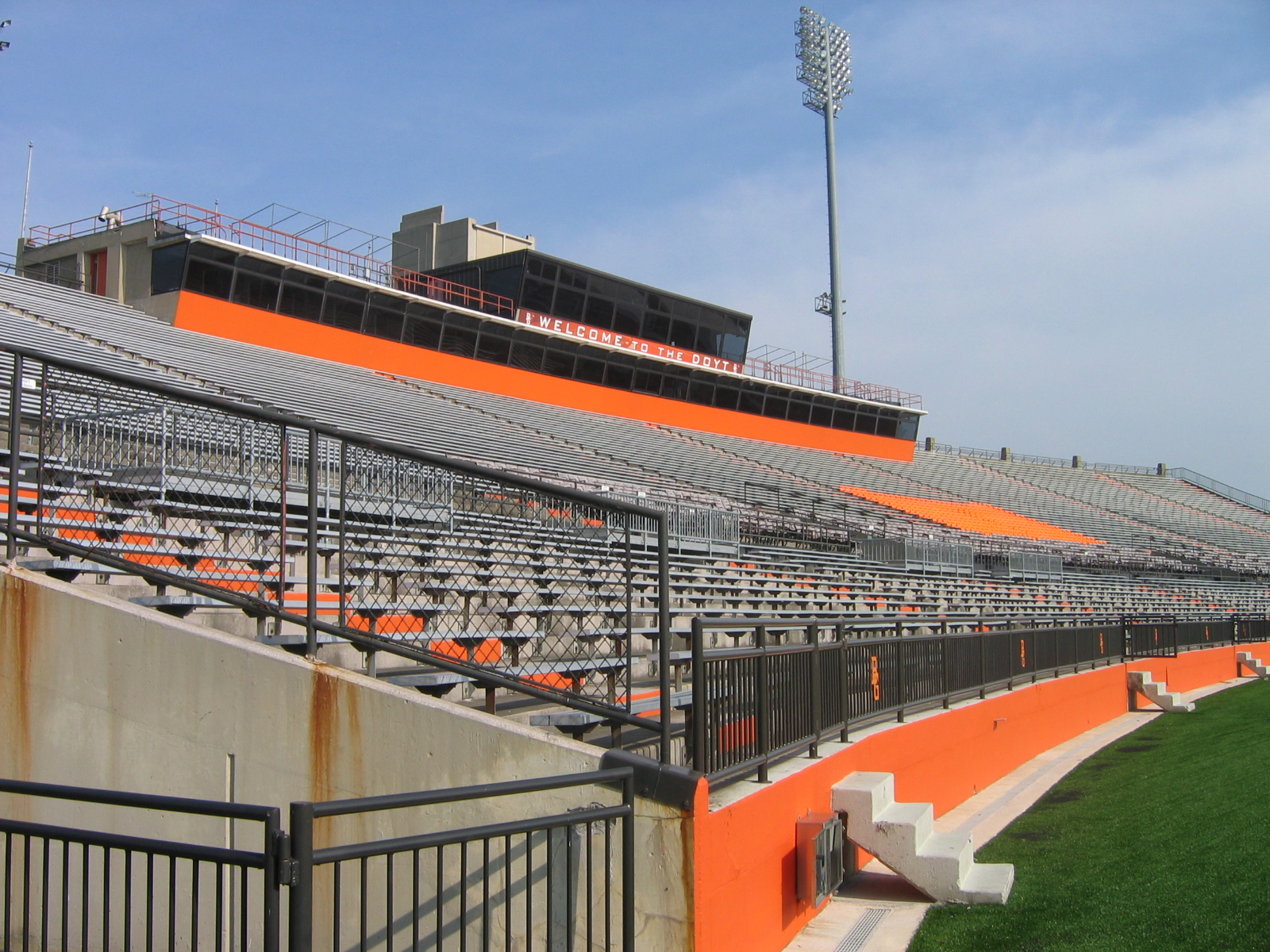
Doyt Perry Stadium

The Doyt Perry Stadium was built in 1966 to replace the 1937 stadium at a cost of $3.9 million, and extensively remodeled in 1997 at a cost of $2 million. On June 1, 1975, the Poe Ditch Music Festival was held here featuring a performance by Richie Havens and Montrose, and a weather canceled performance by Johnny Winter and Golden Earring. The Sebo center was built on the north end zone in 2007 and turned the stadium into a horseshoe shape.

=== Jerome Library ===
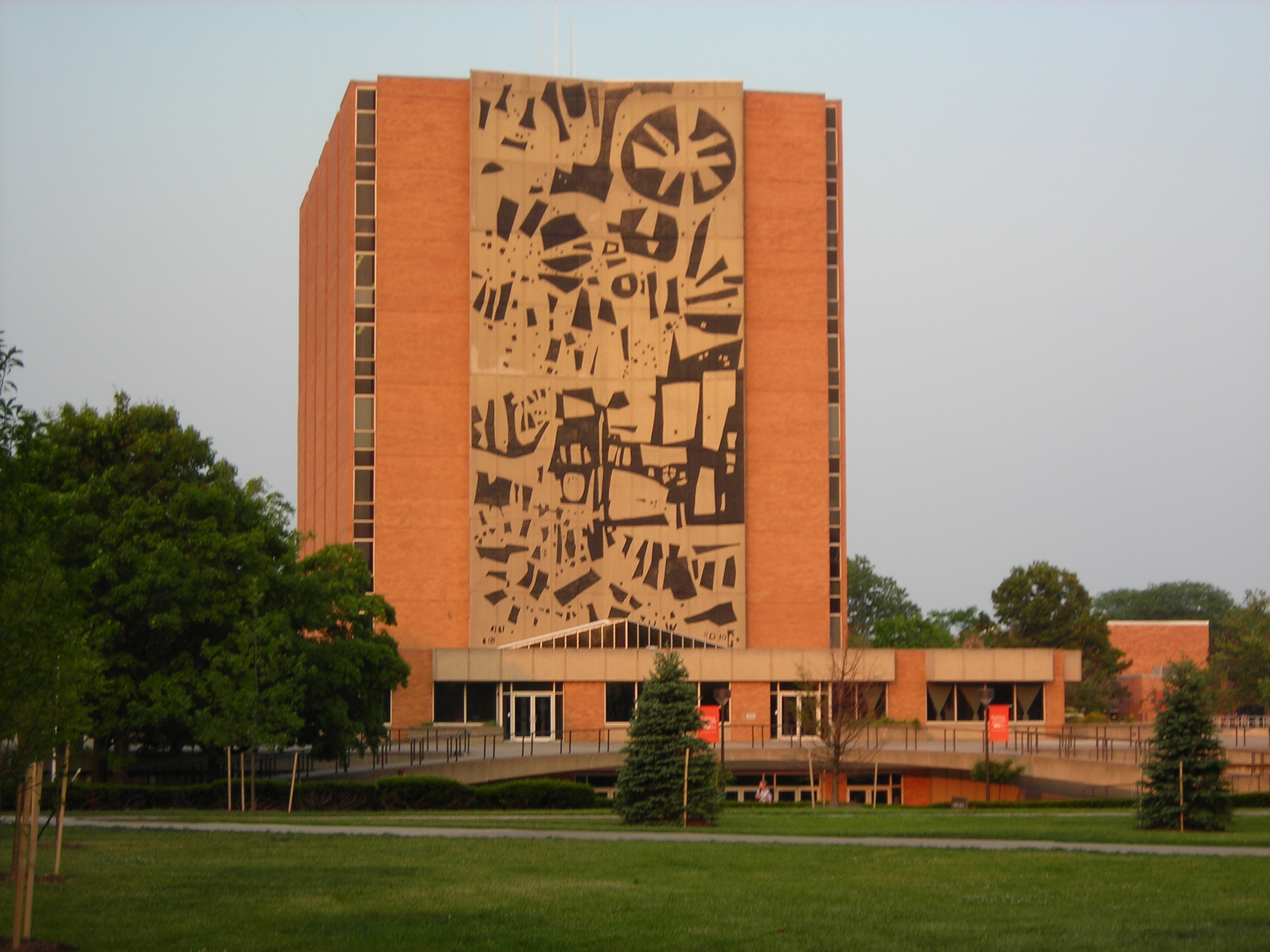
Jerome Library at twilight

Jerome Library was built in 1967 to replace the McFall center as the main library on campus at a cost of $4.5 million. The library exterior contains two murals by Don Drumm. By 1990, fading in the murals had become an issue.

=== Education Building ===
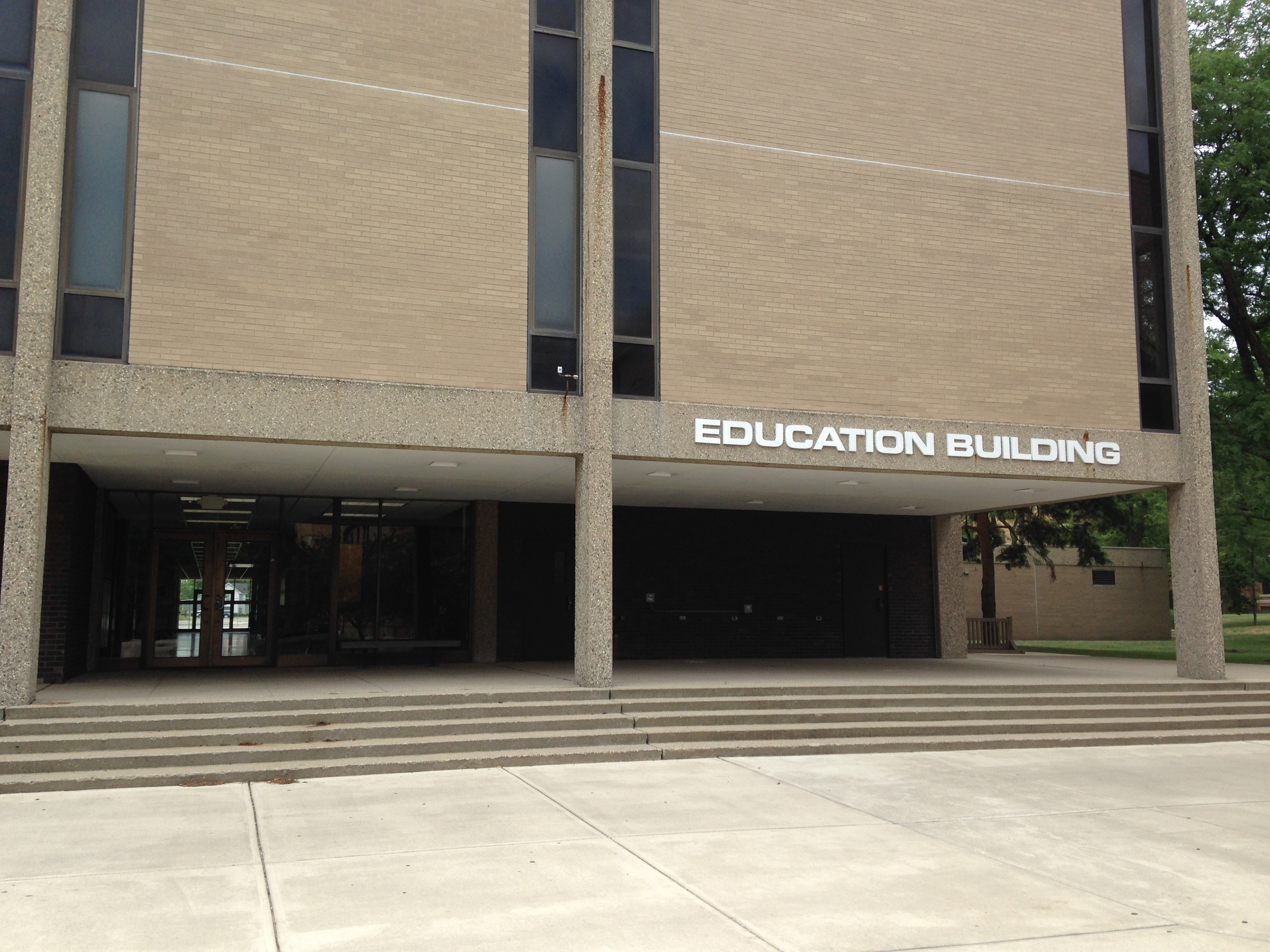
Education Building

Built in 1967 at a cost of $1.8 million to house College of Education and Human Development Facilities. Houses the Technology & Resource Center, a facility dedicated to educational technology such as craft machines, 3D printers, and mobile computers.

=== Health and Human Services ===
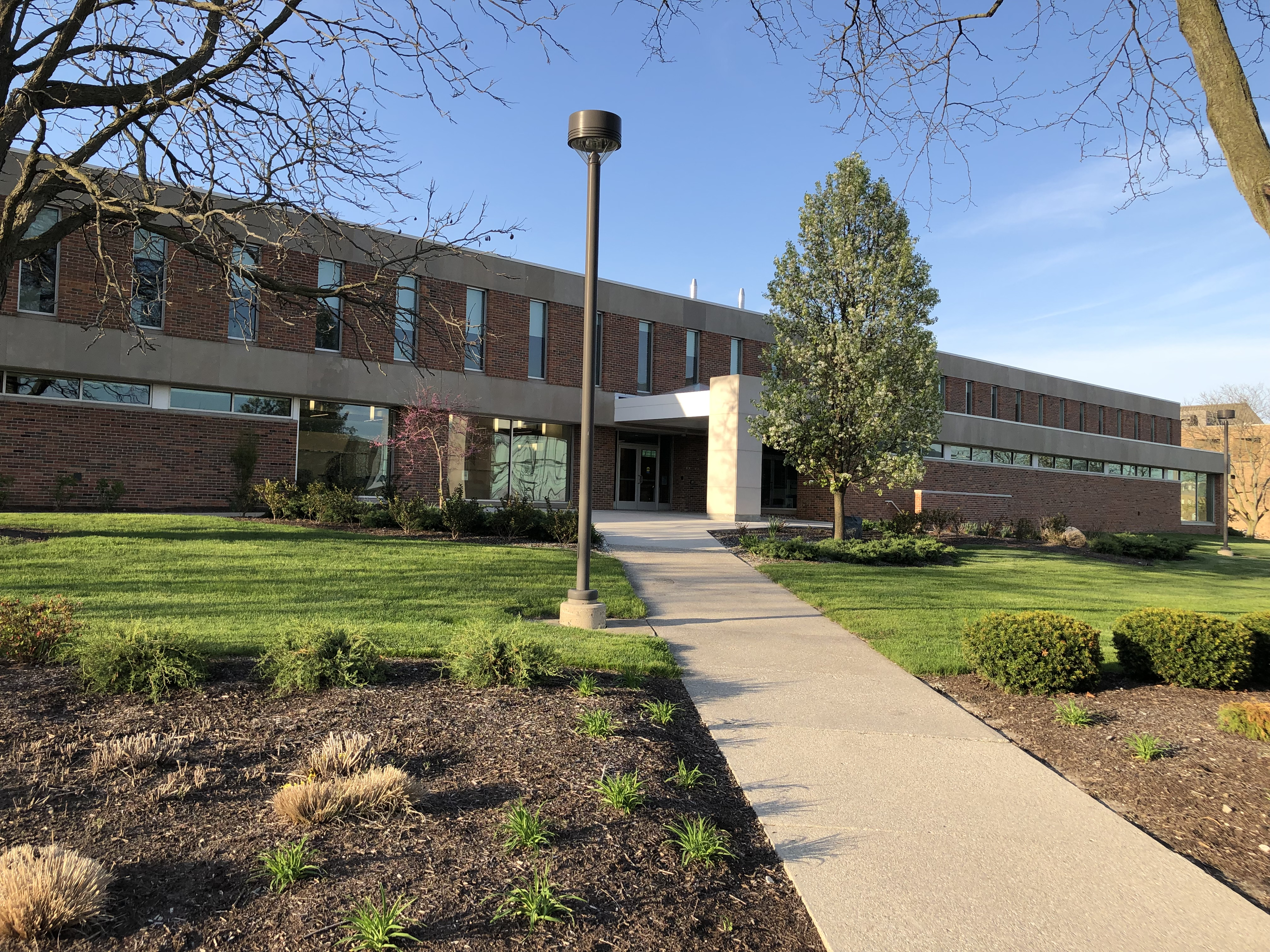
Health and Human Services building

Built in 1967 at a cost of $1 million to replace the 1942 era clinic in Johnson Hall. It was renovated to improve services in 199 and 2010. It was renovated again in 2013 to move the majority of medical services to the then new Falcon Health Center. As of 2019, the building houses the Hearing and Speech Clinic as well as the College of Health and Human Services.

=== Life Sciences Building ===
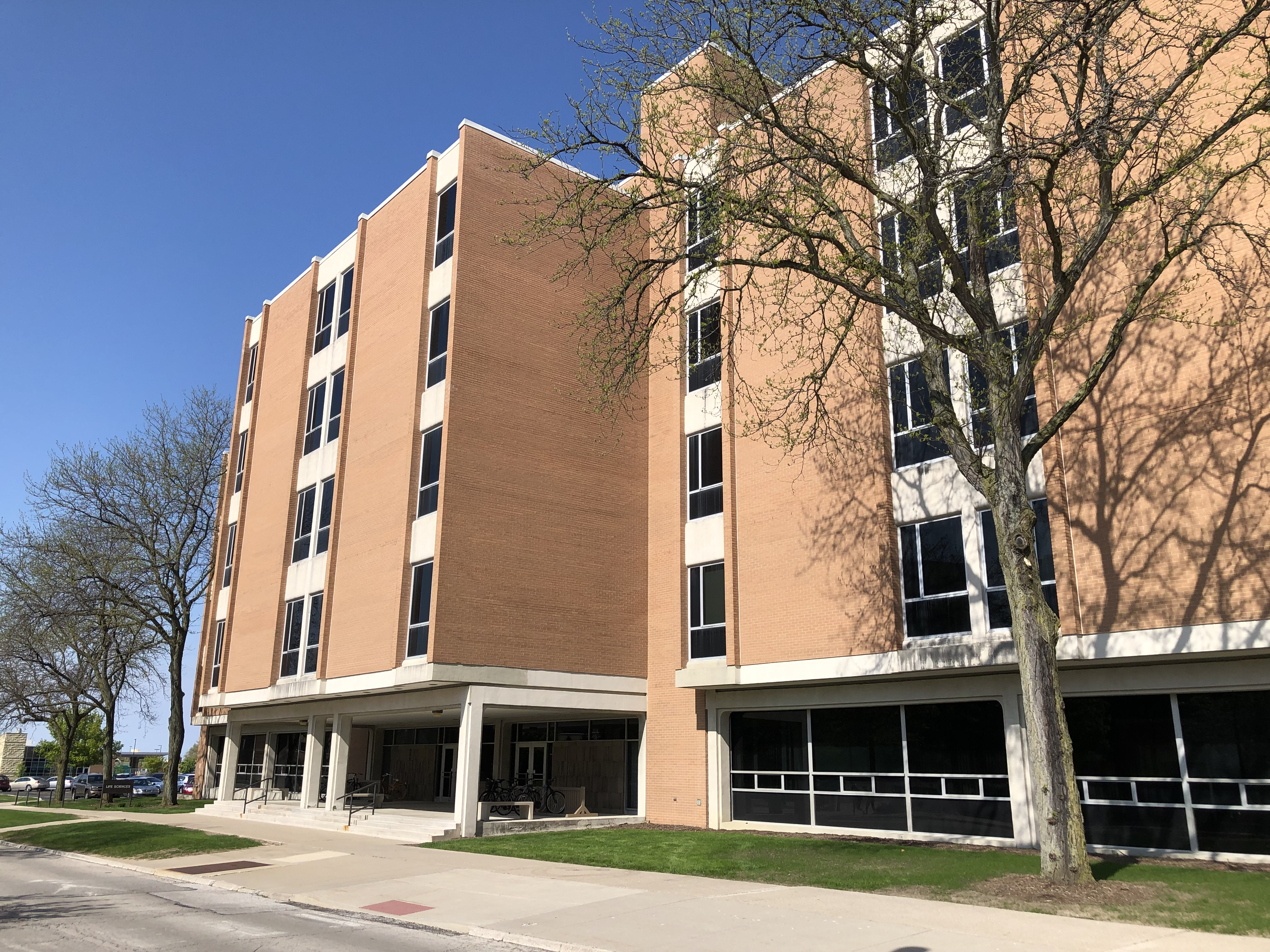
Life Sciences Building

Built at a cost of $4.5 million and dedicated on February 23, 1968 with a speech by Paul Sears. Also that year, the Moseley museum was moved to this building. The building houses the BGSU Herpetarium, which was started in 1997. In 2002, a lab in the building received upgrades for studying polar ice cores. The building also houses a marine laboratory with over 40 aquariums. The aquarium houses a snowflake eel, striped bamboo catsharks, zebrafish, catfish, clownfish, and a coral husbandry program. The building houses the Ohio Attorney General Center for the Future of Forensic Science.

=== Wooster Street Center ===
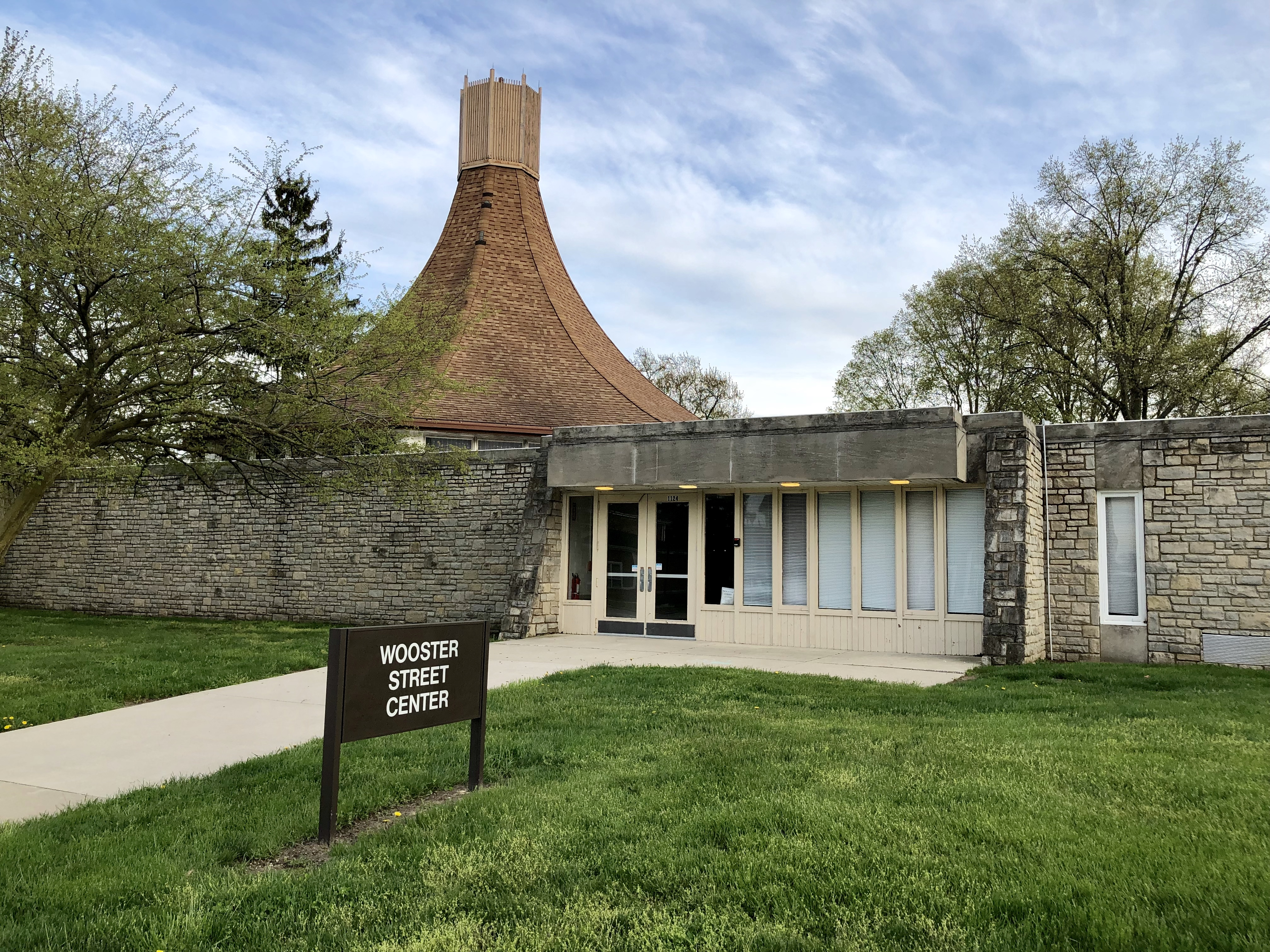
Wooster Street Center

Built in 1969 as the University Lutheran Chapel by the Lutheran Church–Missouri Synod. After the church closed, the building was purchased by the University in October 2003 to house the Elsewhere theater. The center also housed the Student Legal Services law firm as of 2019. In May 2020 the building was demolished, with a university official citing issues with the foundation and roof as factors in the decision to demolish the building.

=== Psychology Building ===
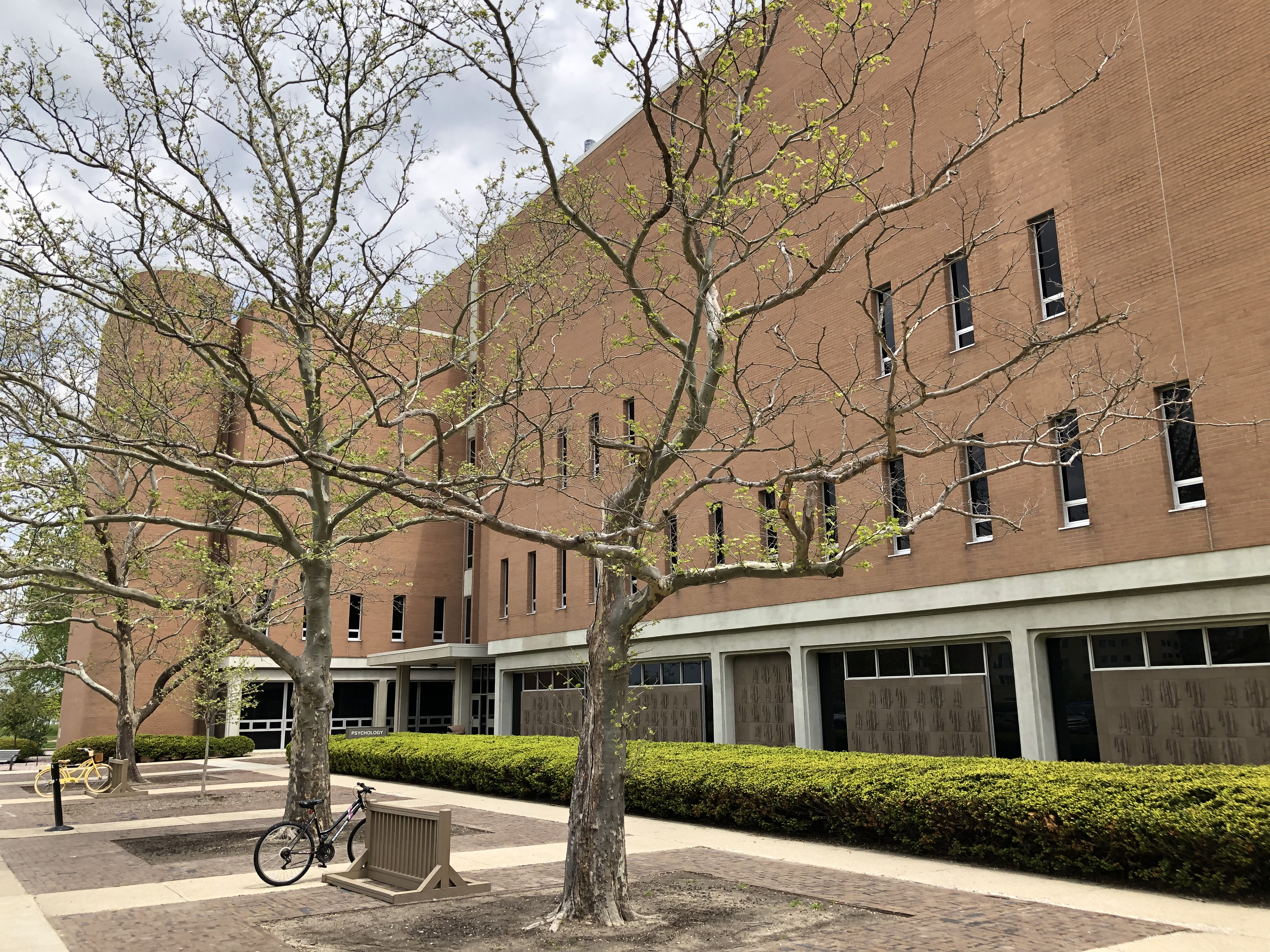
Psychology Building

Built in 1969 at a cost of $2.8 million to host psychology laboratories and classrooms. The fifth floor is used to study behavioral neuroscience using radiological, biochemical, histological, and electrophysical methods.

=== McLeod Hall ===
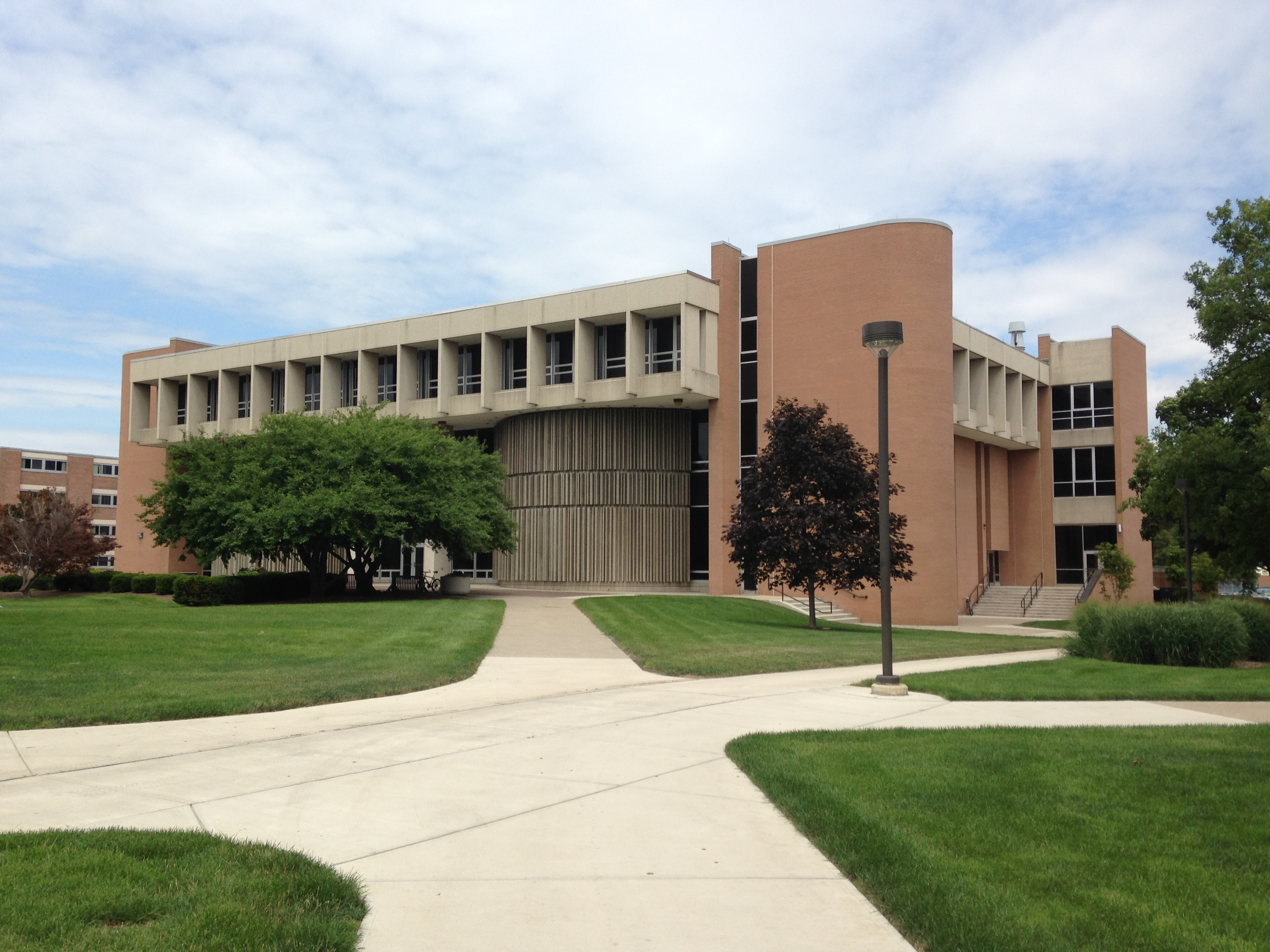
Mathematical Sciences Building

A 113,000 sq ft building built in 1970 at a cost of $7.2 million to house Mathematics and Computer Science departments, as well as university computer systems. In 1976 a glass sculpture of an Icosahedron made by Dominick Labino was installed. In 2018 a Digital forensics lab began construction on the third floor of the building.

=== Offenhauer Towers ===
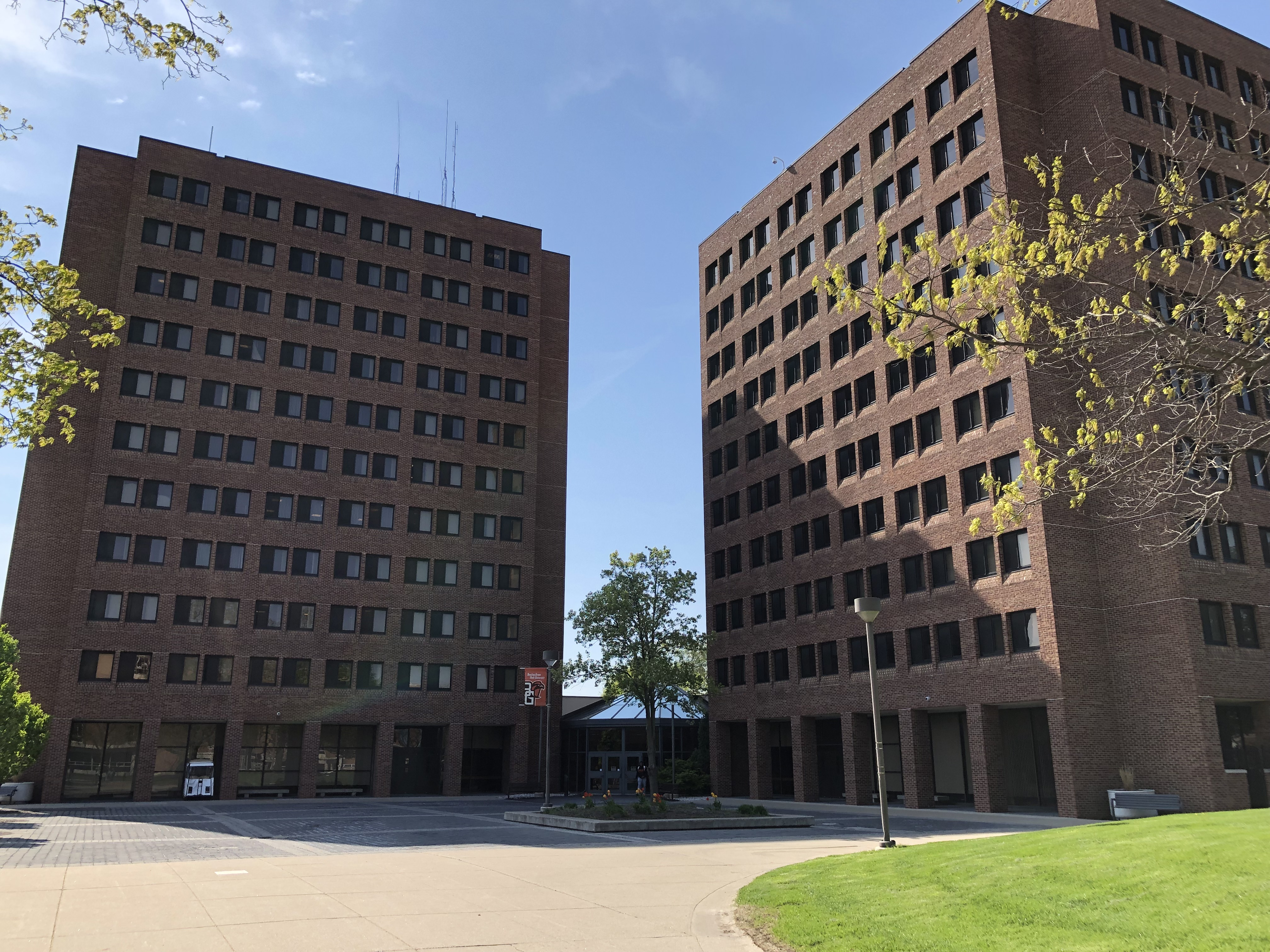
Offenhauer Towers

A Residence Hall built in 1971 at a cost of $9.4 million. In 1991 Dr. Hiroko Nakamoto sponsored the creation of a Japanese family room with a tokonoma on the 11th floor of the west tower. The 11th floor of the west tower was renovated in 2023 to feature pod style living. As of 2019 the towers house over 800 students.

=== Central Hall ===
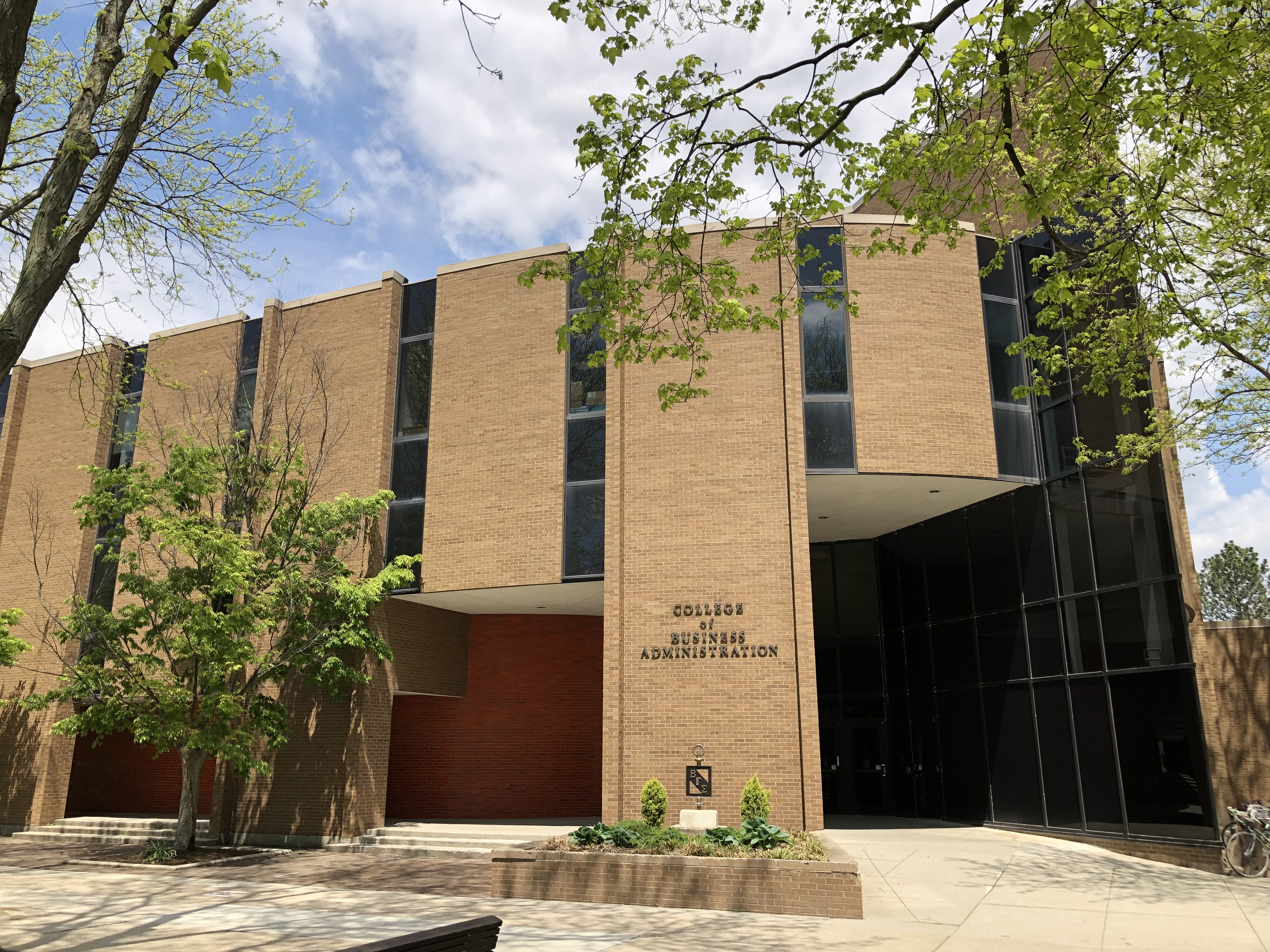
Central Hall

Built in 1972 as the Business Administration Building at a cost of $2.3 million to centralize the College of Business. An annex was added in 1988 at a cost of $3.5 million. Hosts the Paul J Hooker Center for Entrepreneurial Leadership, which promotes entrepreneurship in the region. In 2020 the building was renamed to Central Hall due to the College of Business moving to the Maurer Center, and parts of the then new School of Nursing were consolidated on its second and third floors.

=== Technology Building ===
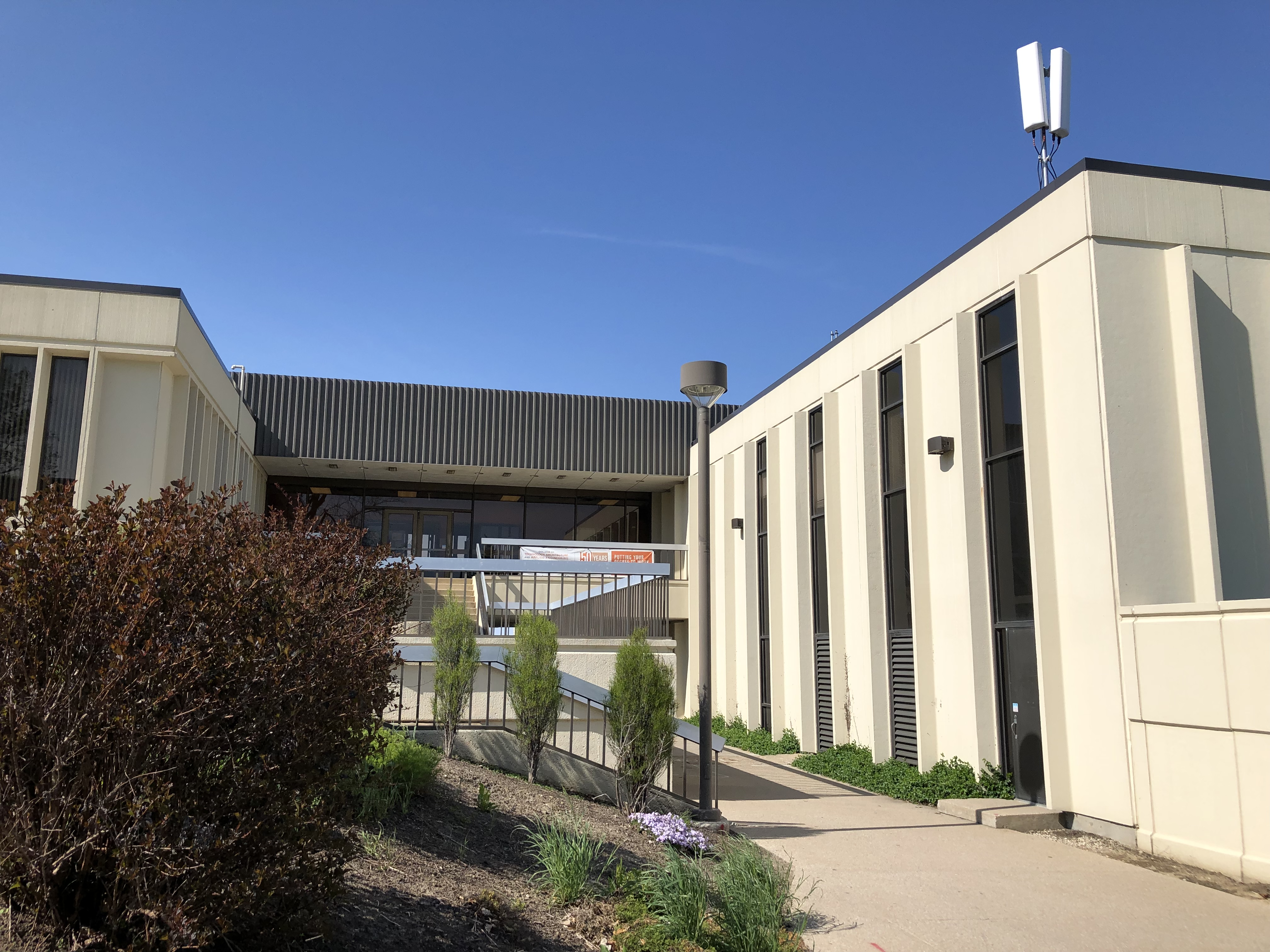
Technology Building

Built in 1973 at a cost of $2.2 million as the Industrial Education & Technology Building. In the 1970's the roof of the building housed an experimental windmill.

The Stephen and Deborah Harris / RIXAN Robotics Laboratory houses 10 Mitsubishi SCARA industrial robots. Other facilities include a CAD laboratory, a 3D Printing laboratory, a computer engineering laboratory, and a machine shop.

=== Mileti Alumni Center ===
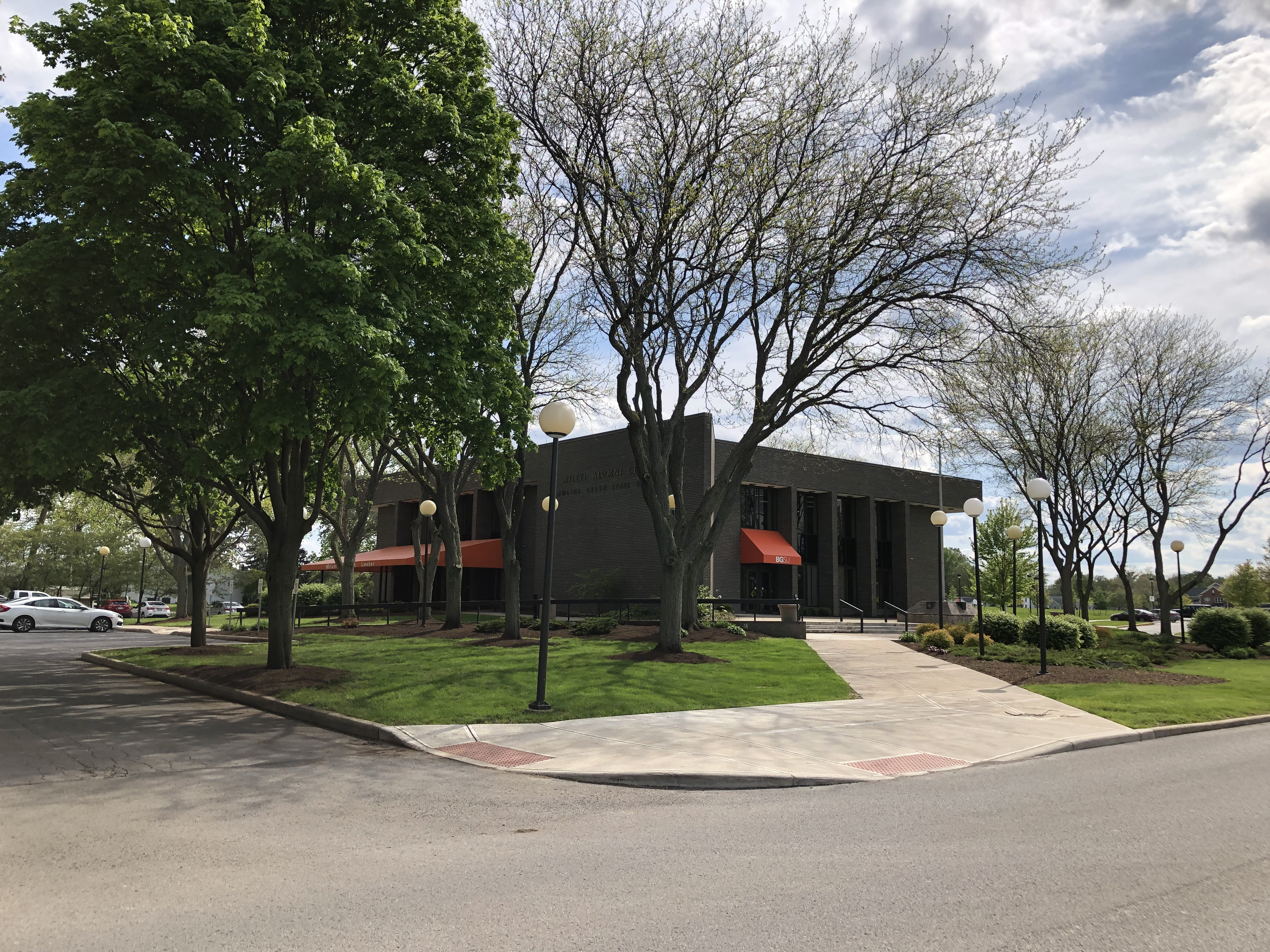
Mileti Alumni Center

Built in 1976 at a cost of almost $1 million and named after Nick Mileti.

=== Moore Musical Arts Center ===
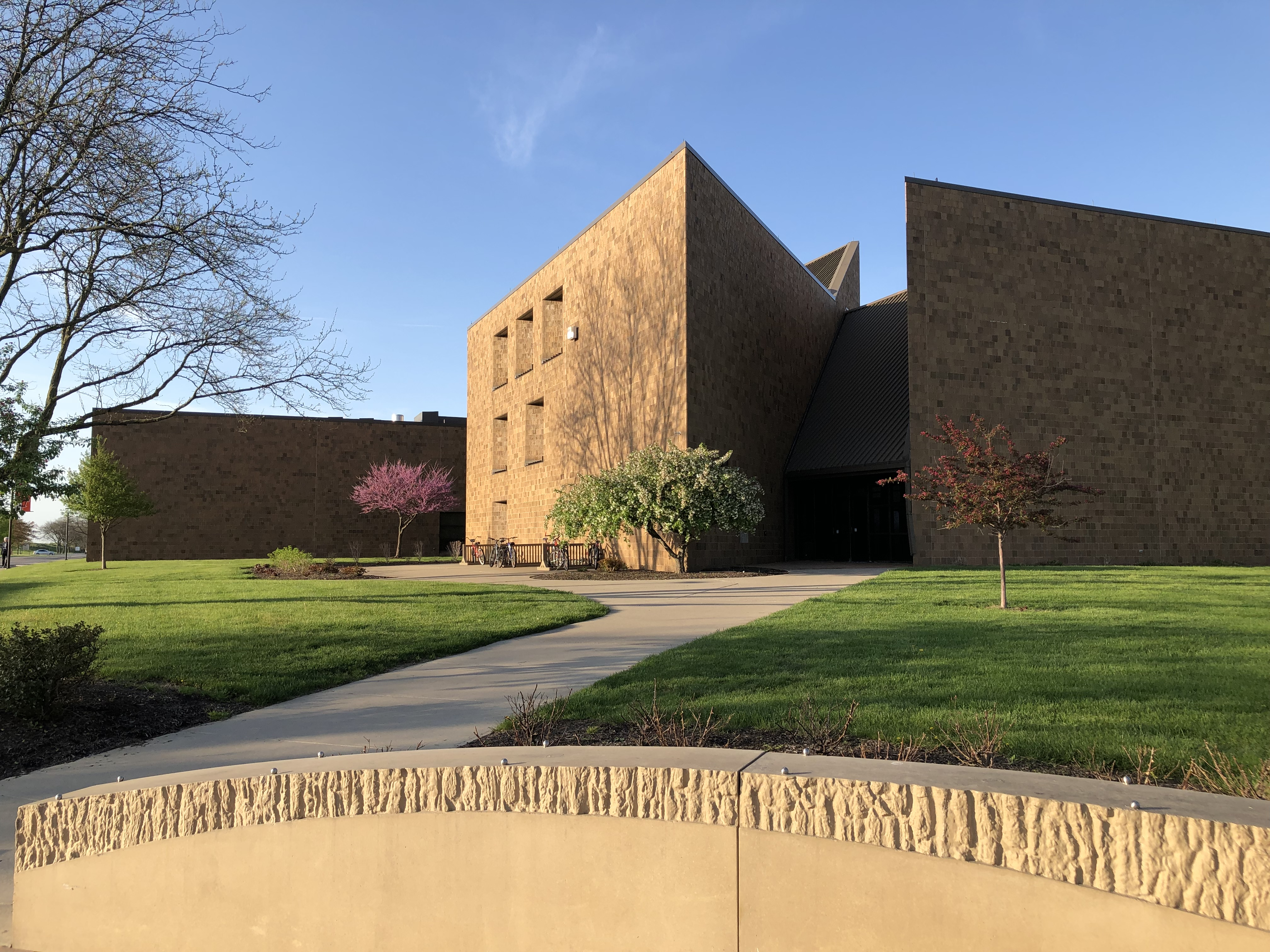
Moore Musical Arts Center

Built in 1979 at a cost of $9 million. Hosts the 822 seat proscenium Kobacker Hall, the 231 seat Bryan recital hall, recording studios, and over 70 practice rooms. The center houses the College of Musical Arts.

Mark Peskanov performed at Bryan Recital Hall with a Kiesewetter Stradivarius on December 9, 1981.

Cellist Yo-Yo Ma performed in the 1980-1981 festival series, then returned on January 19, 2000 to play with pianist Kathryn Stott performed at Kobacker Hall. Dane Cook performed at Kobacker Hall in 2004 to a sold-out show. On March 16, 2010 the band Over the Rhine performed here in collaboration with University Activities Organization and CRU to raise money in support of the relief efforts for the 2010 Haiti earthquake.

=== Student Recreation Center ===
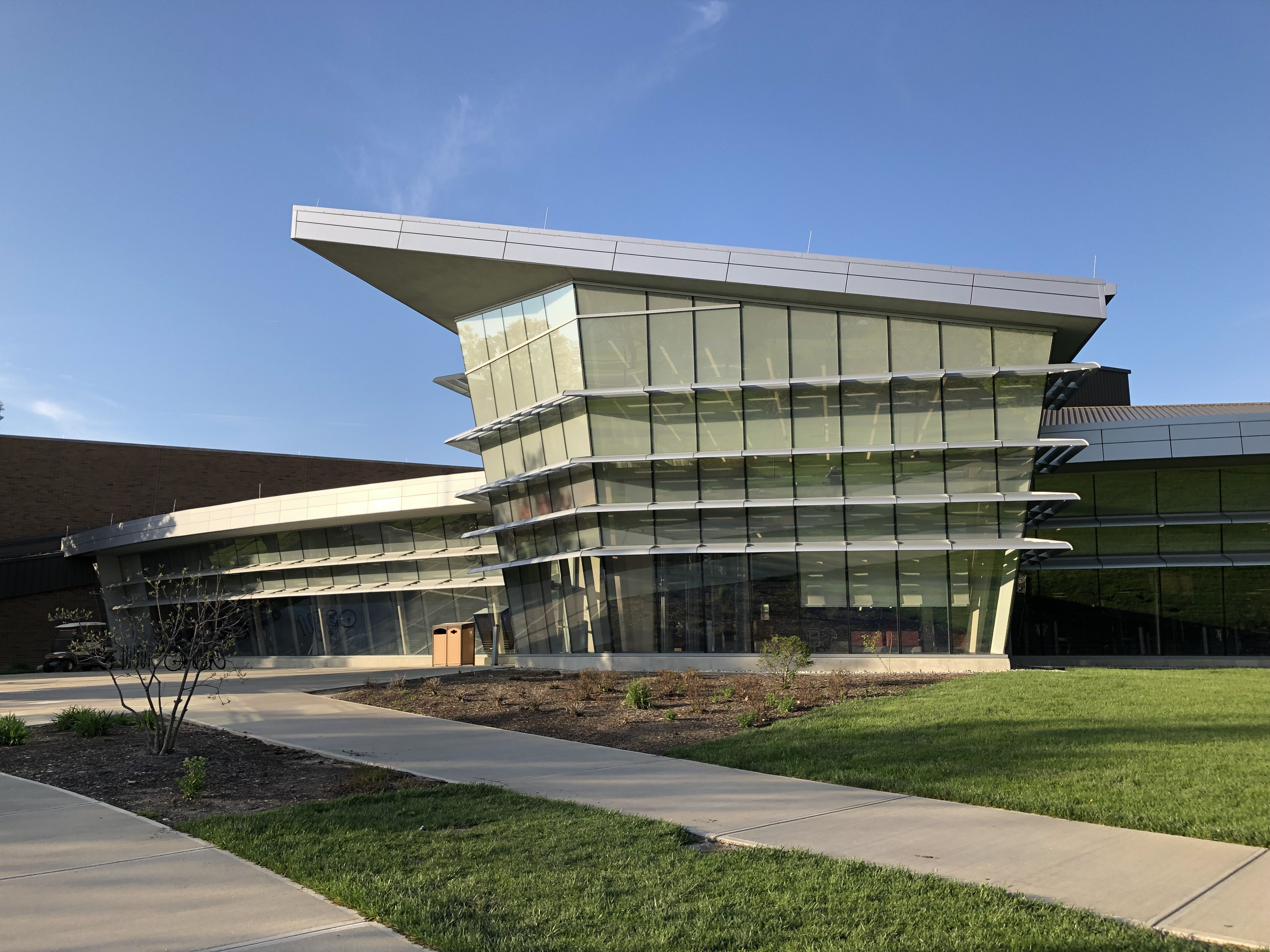
Rec Center

Opened on January 4, 1979 at a cost of $6 million and renovated in 2014. Facilities beyond generic equipment include an Olympic sized swimming pool, a recreational pool, a 12-person hot tub, and a climbing wall.

=== Eppler Complex ===
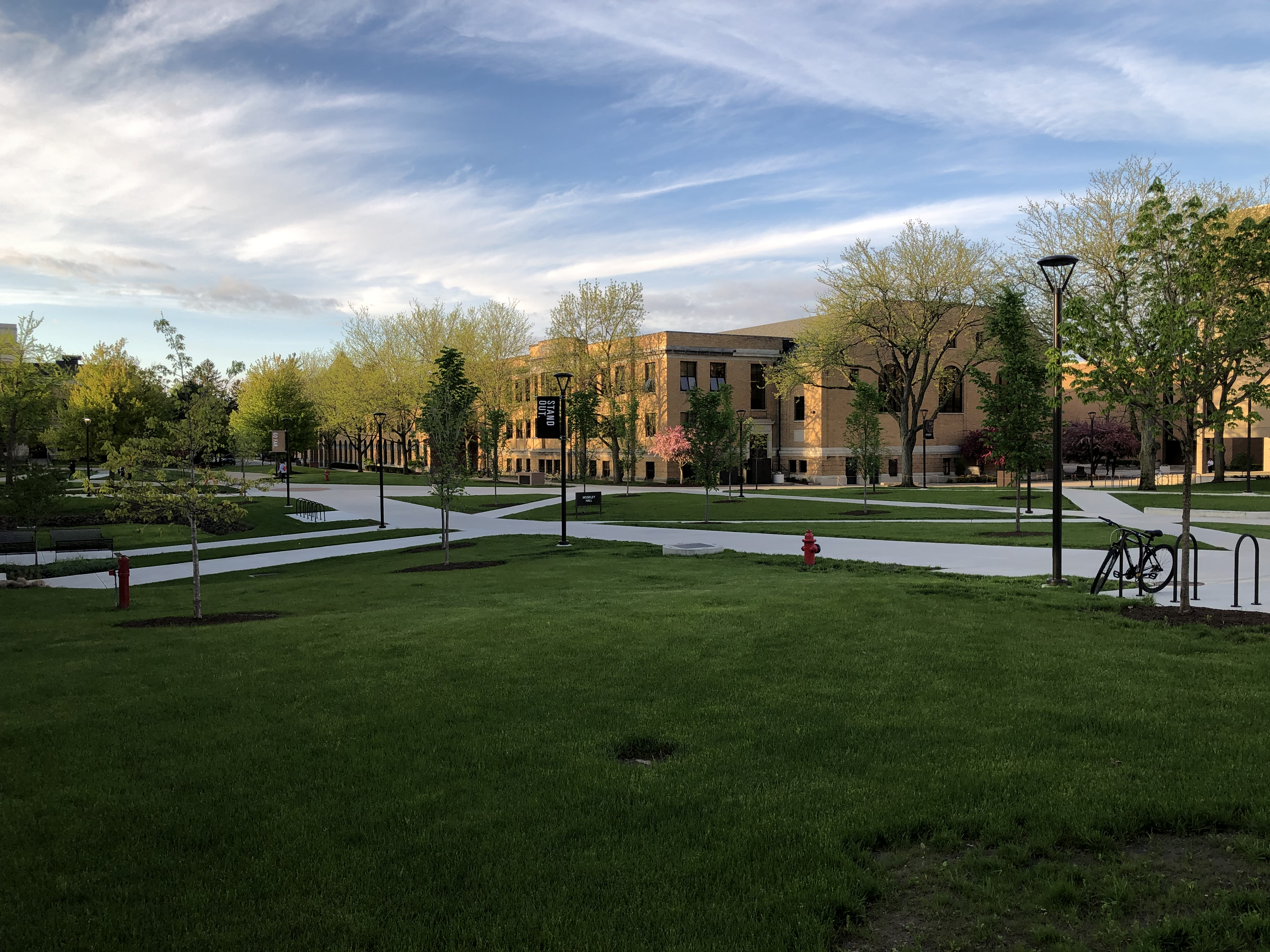
Eppler Complex

A classroom building built in 1980 by combining the former 1920's era Men's Gymnasium and Women's Gymnasium buildings.

=== Social Philosophy and Policy Center ===
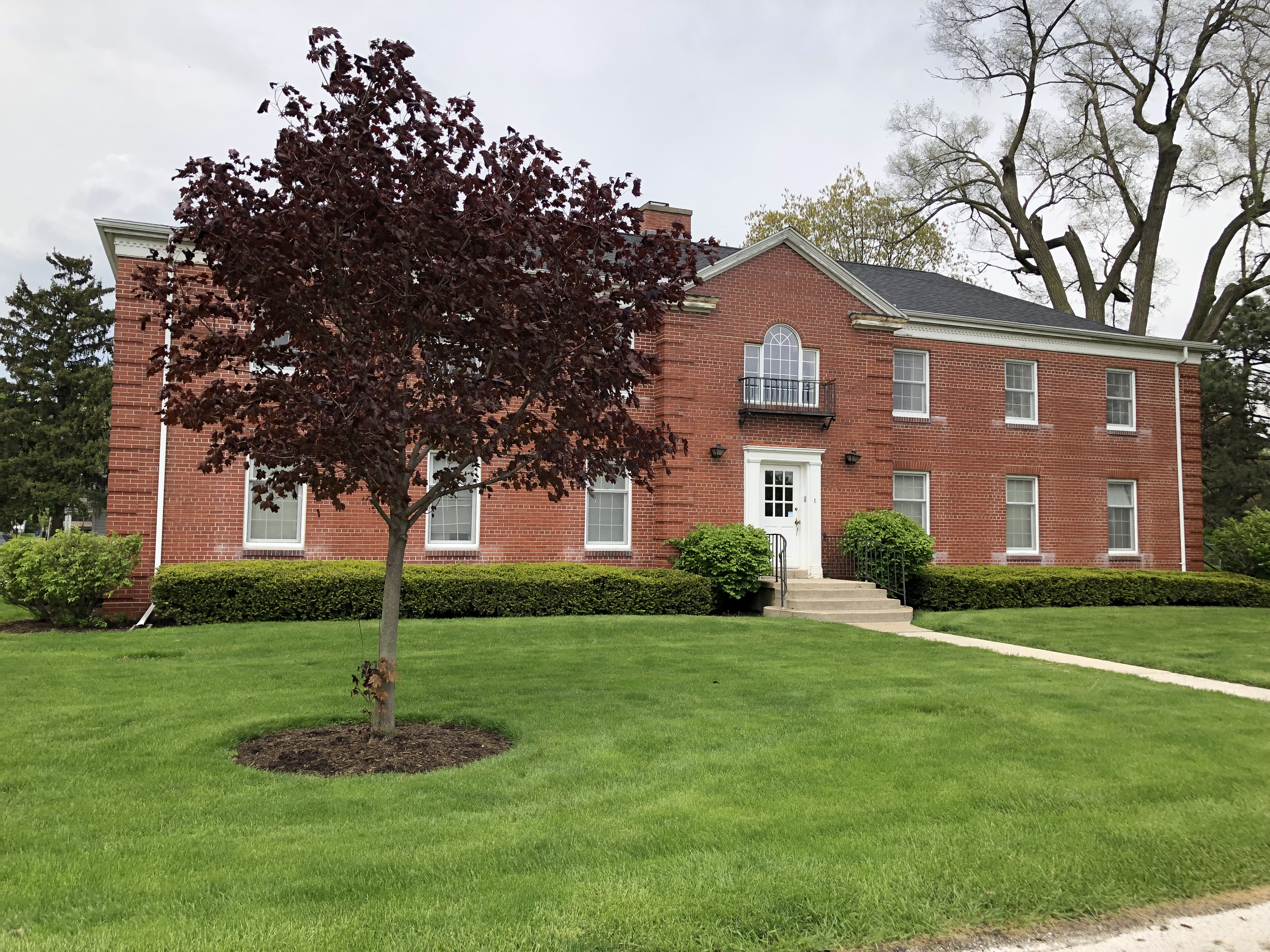

Established in 1981. Houses offices.

=== Former Architecture Studies Building ===
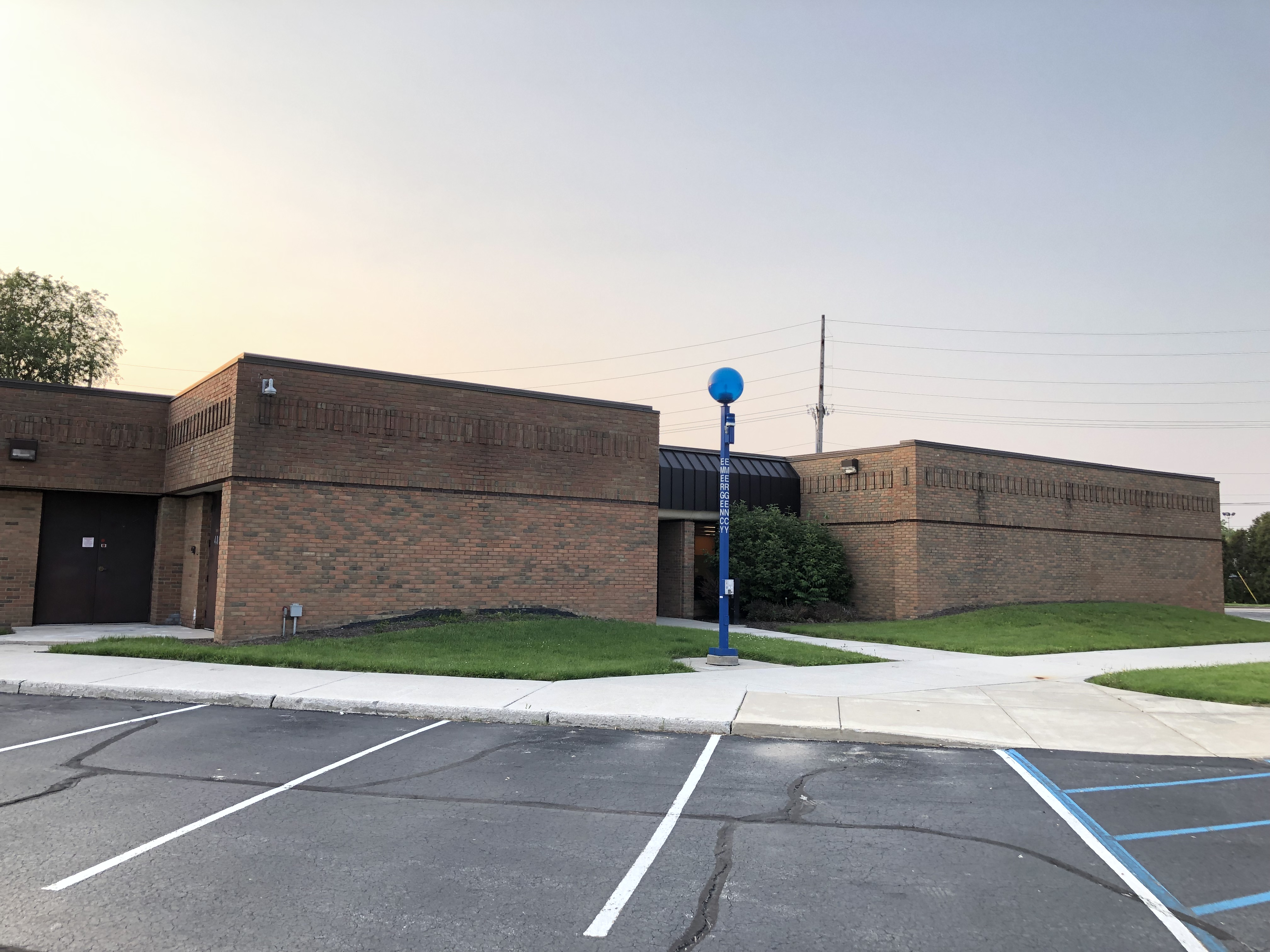

Built by the Ohio Department of Job and Family Services in 1981 to assist with employment. In 2006 the building was purchased by the university, and became an architecture building in 2008. Currently operates as a call center for the University.

=== Physical Sciences Laboratory Building ===
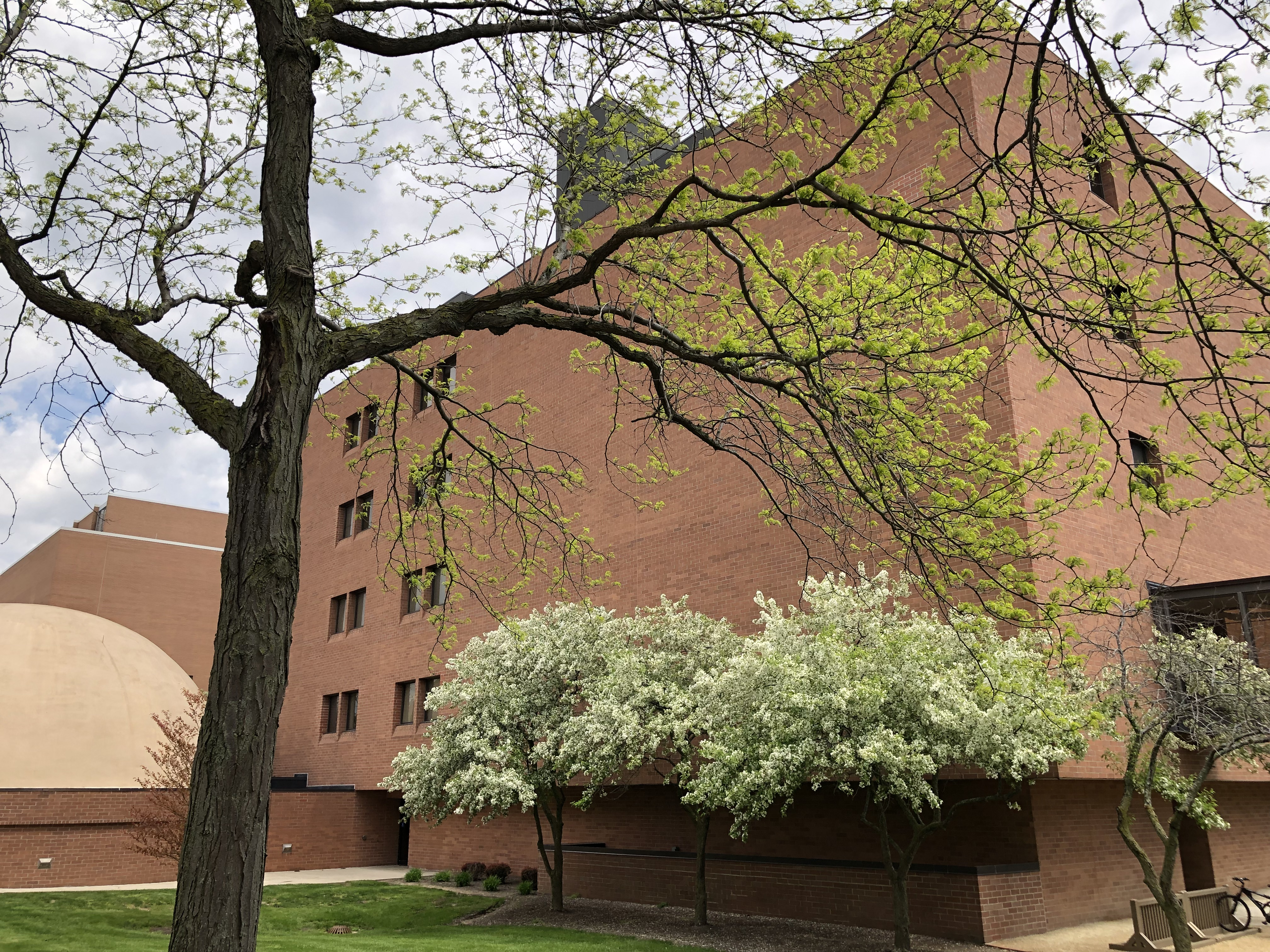
Physical Sciences Laboratory Building

Built in 1984 at a cost of $7.2 million to house research labs, an observatory, and a planetarium. The planetarium inauguration on April 27, 1984 included a lecture by Anthony Aveni. The observatory houses a reflecting telescope with a mirror measuring 20 inches (51 cm) made by DFM Engineering and a CCD camera. The roof and observatory are used for stargazing sessions. The observatory also hosts events promoting the save viewing of the occasional solar eclipse.

=== Visitor Information Center ===
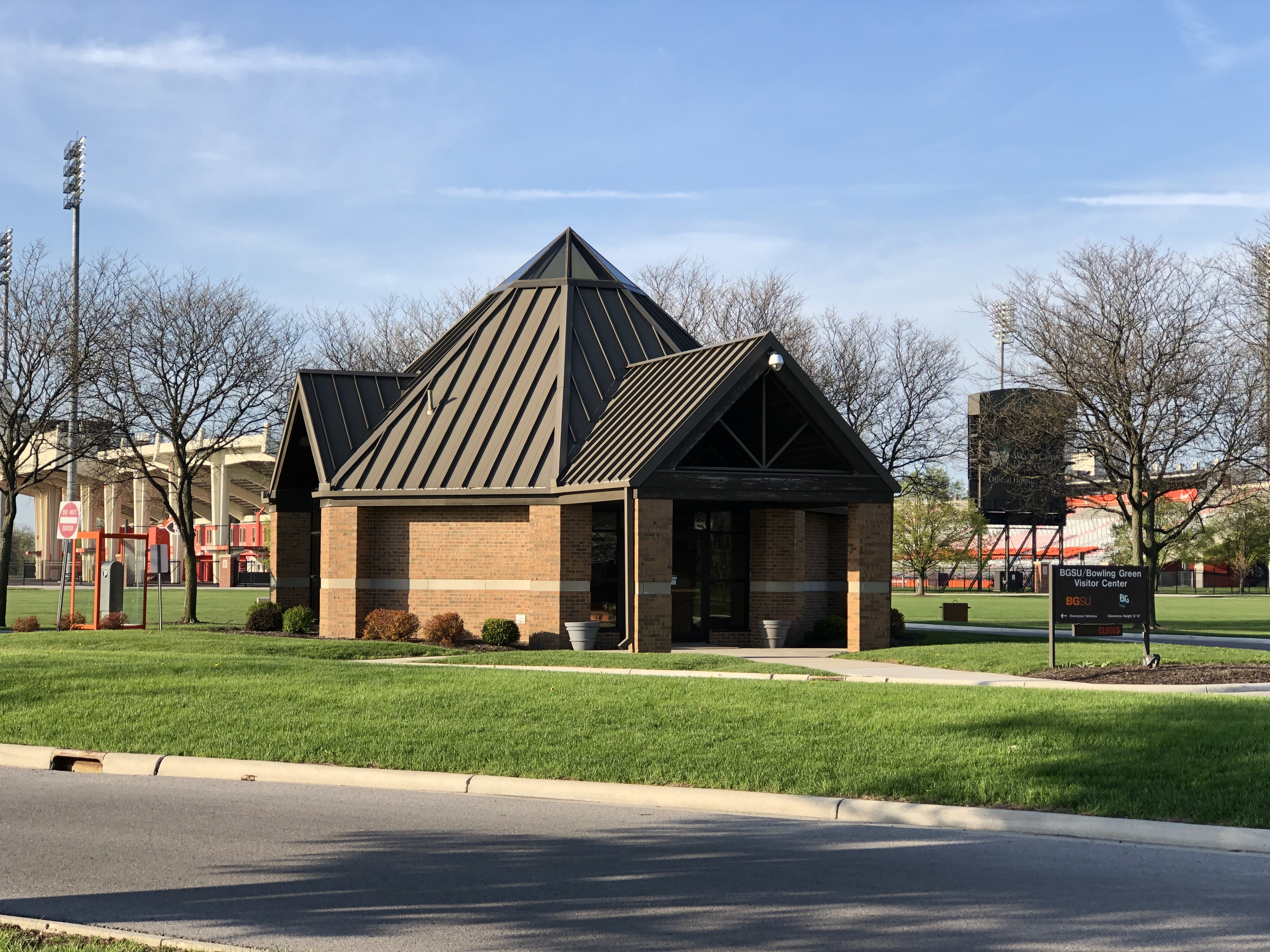
Visitor Information Center

Built in 1989 at a cost of $600,000. Staffing of the facility was handed over to the Bowling Green Convention and Visitors bureau in 2013.

=== College Park Office Building ===
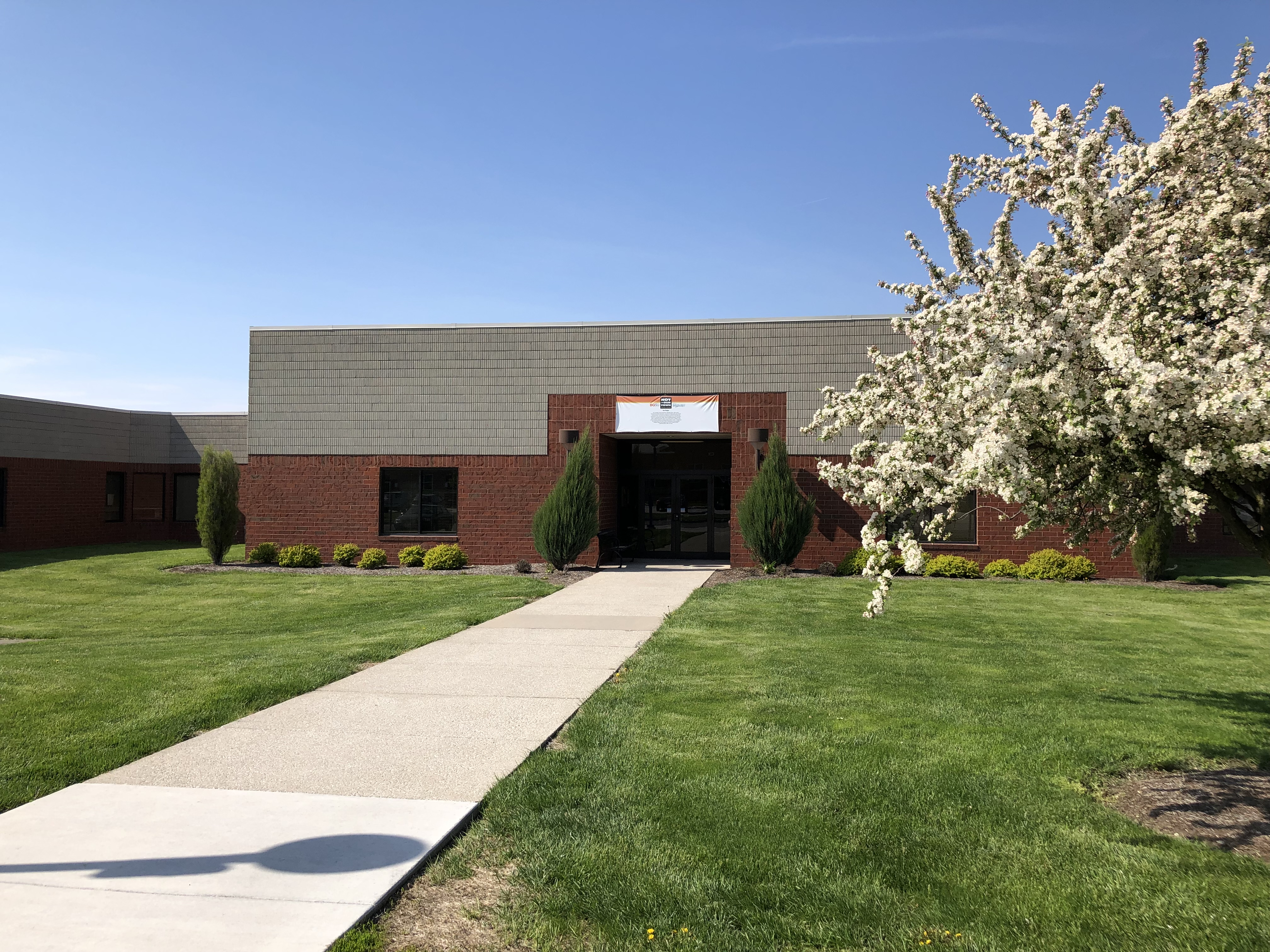
College Park Office Building

Built in 1989 to accommodate various offices during renovations. Houses the BGSU Police department, Nontraditional and Military Students Services, and a virtual reality lab.

=== Perry Field House ===
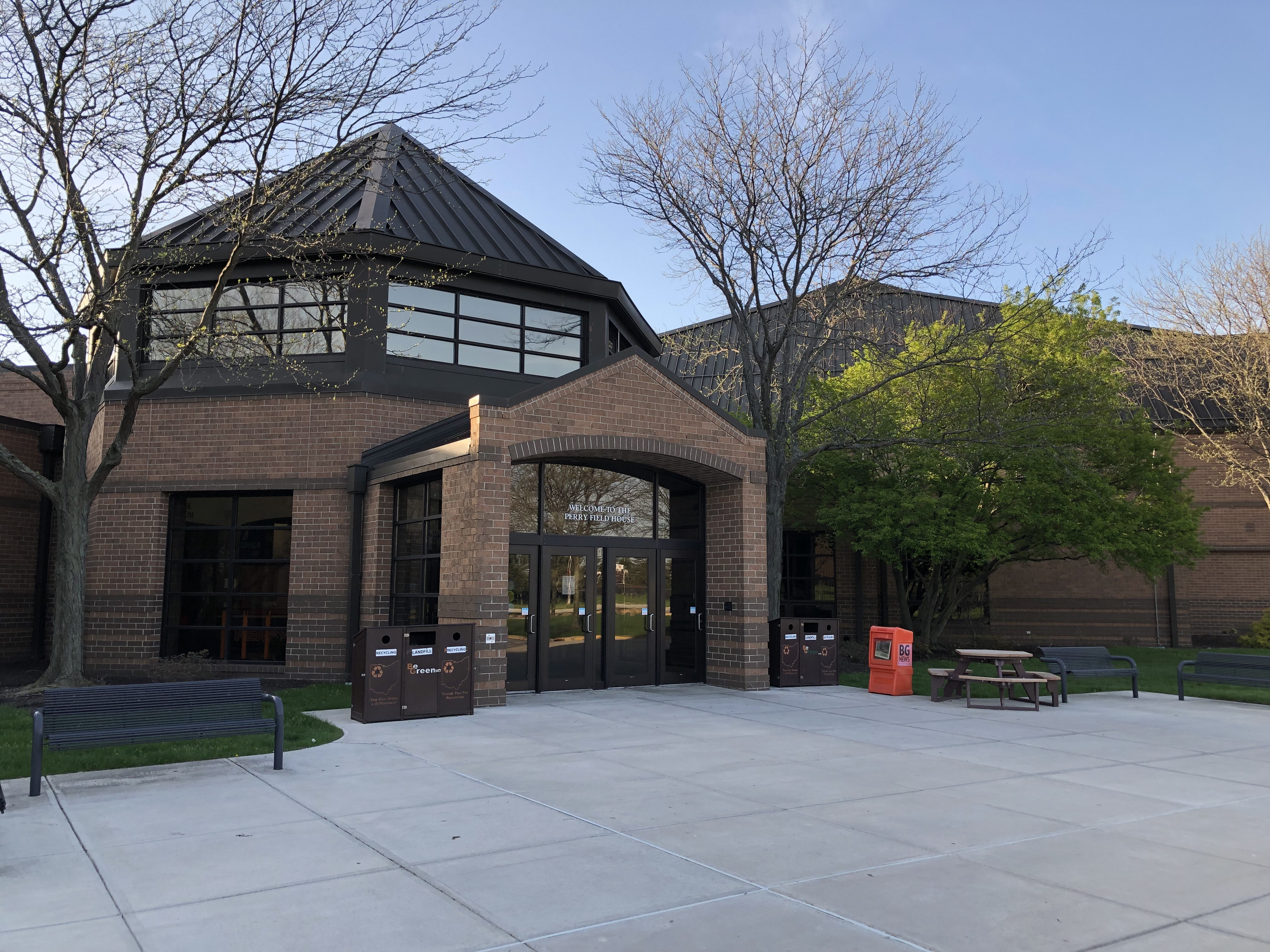
Perry Field House

Built in 1992 at a cost of $8.7 million to promote intramural sports. The building won an award from the Masonry Institute of Northwestern Ohio in 1993 for its masonry design. In 2015 the metal halide lighting of the field house was replaced LED lighting. Includes a track room and a turf room. The building is used to house Literacy in the Park. During the COVID-19 pandemic in Ohio, the building was used to house blood drives for the American Red Cross.

=== Olscamp Hall ===
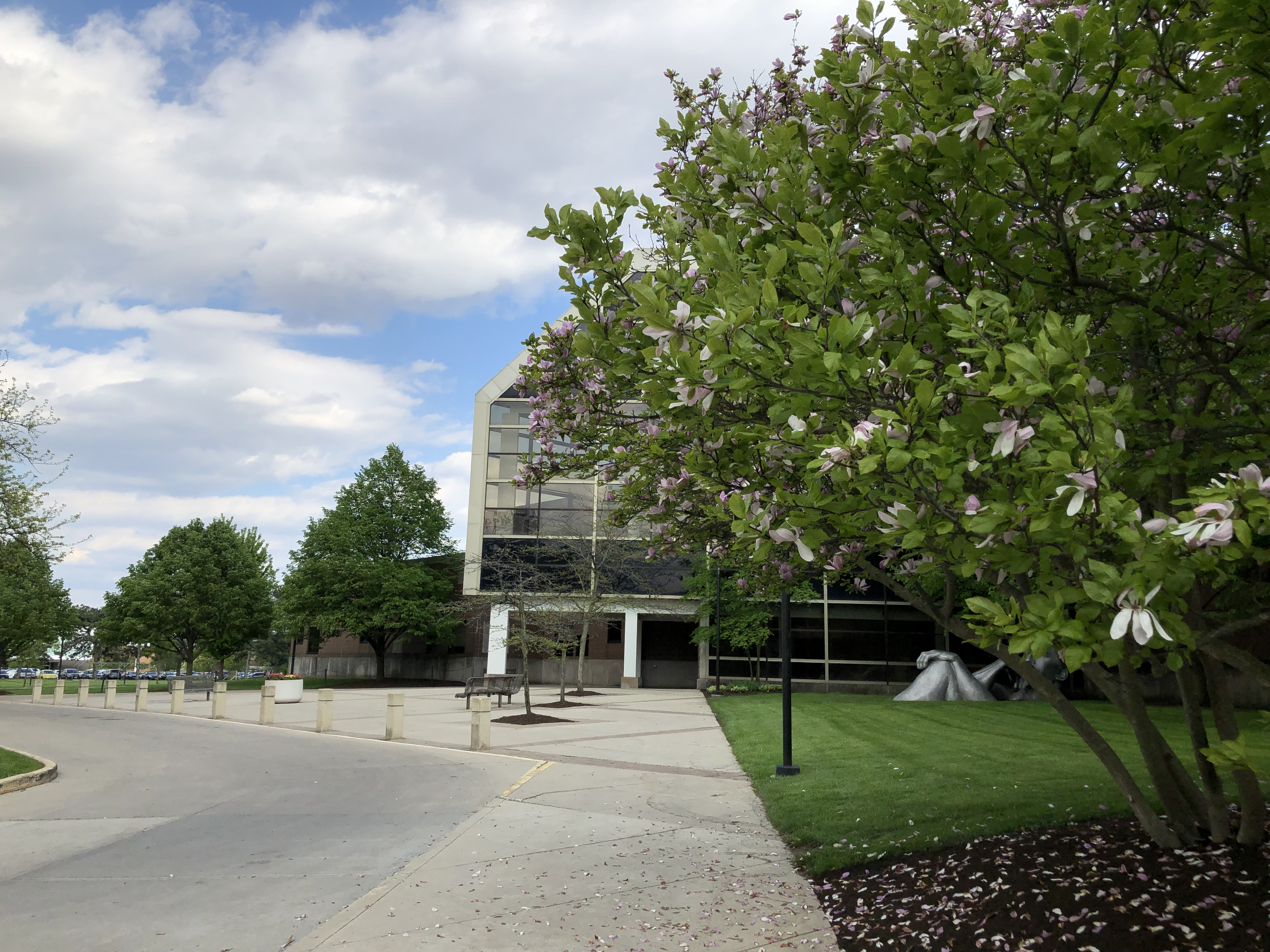
Olscamp Hall

A 95,000 square foot building, completed in 1994 at a cost of $13.5 million as a technology and computer enhanced classroom building. The hall was renovated in 2015 to promote active learning and math education.

=== Jordan Family Development Center ===
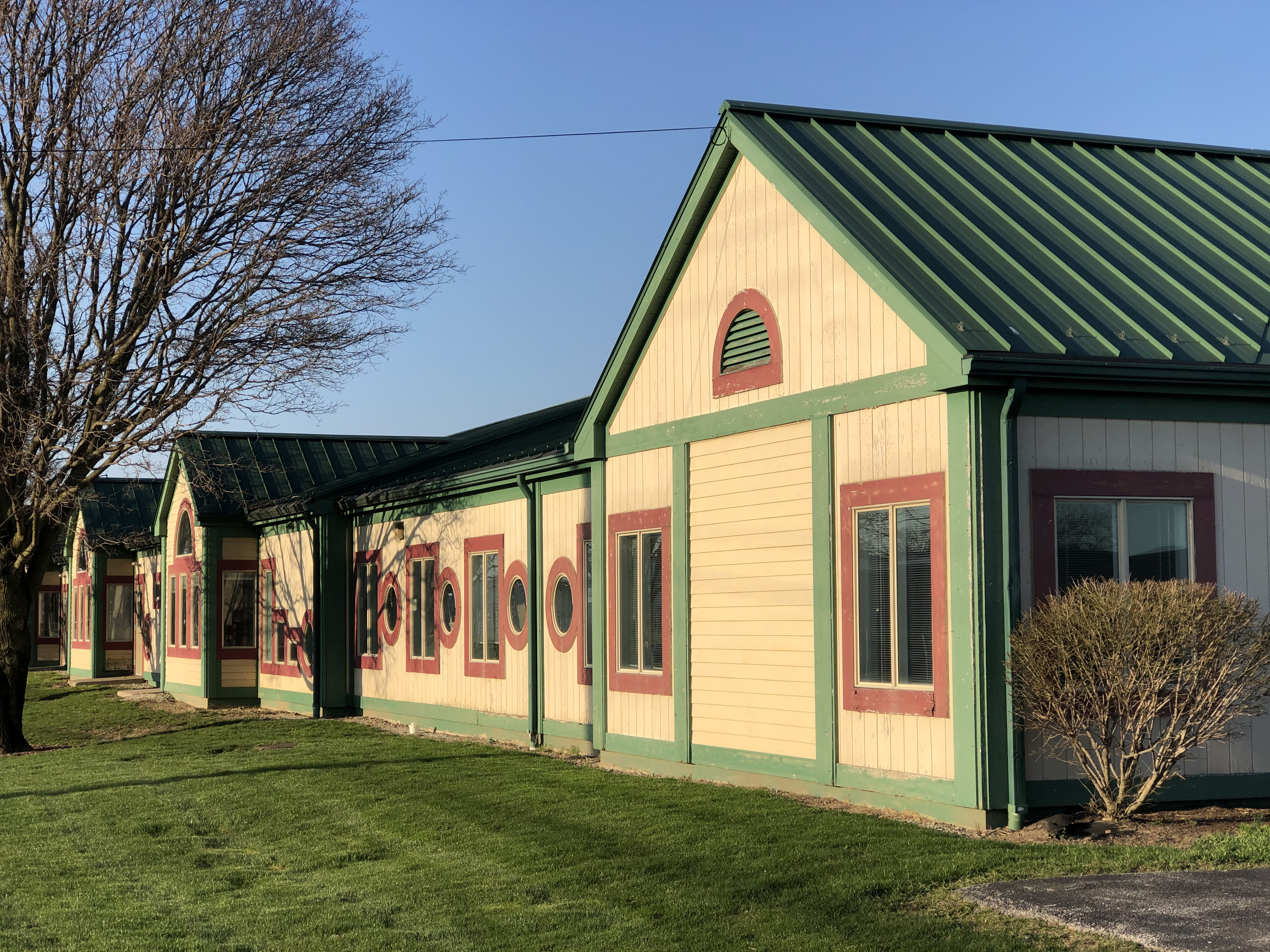
Jordan Family Development Center and Child Development Lab

Built in 1996 to handle demand for on campus child care. Housed the Child Development Lab. The Lab was closed due to budget cuts in 2020.

=== Heating Plant ===
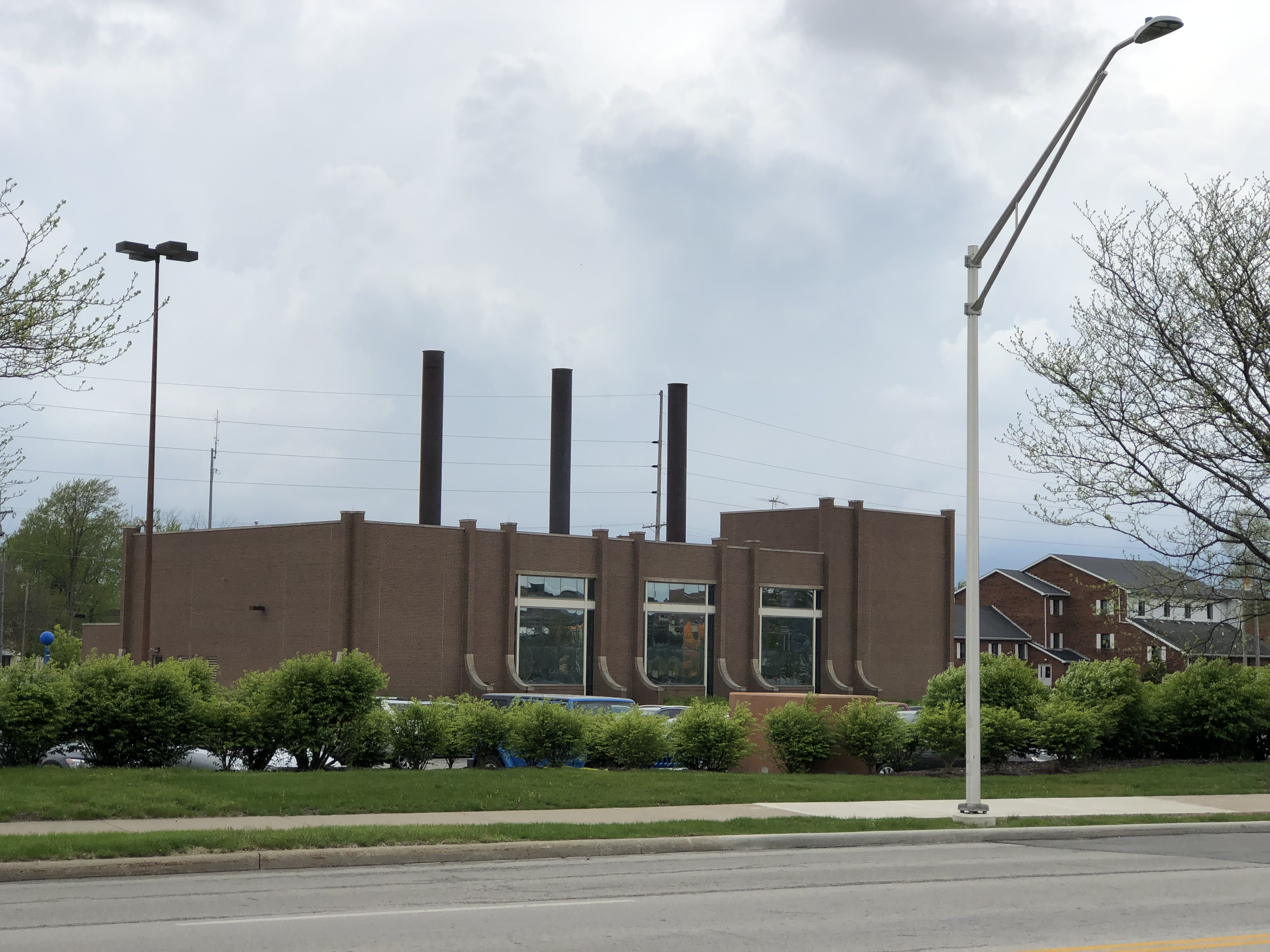
The Heating Plant

A 12,000 square foot, three boiler natural gas heating plant that uses 4 million square feet of gas annually. The current plant replaced an earlier plant around 1999.

=== Wolfe Center ===
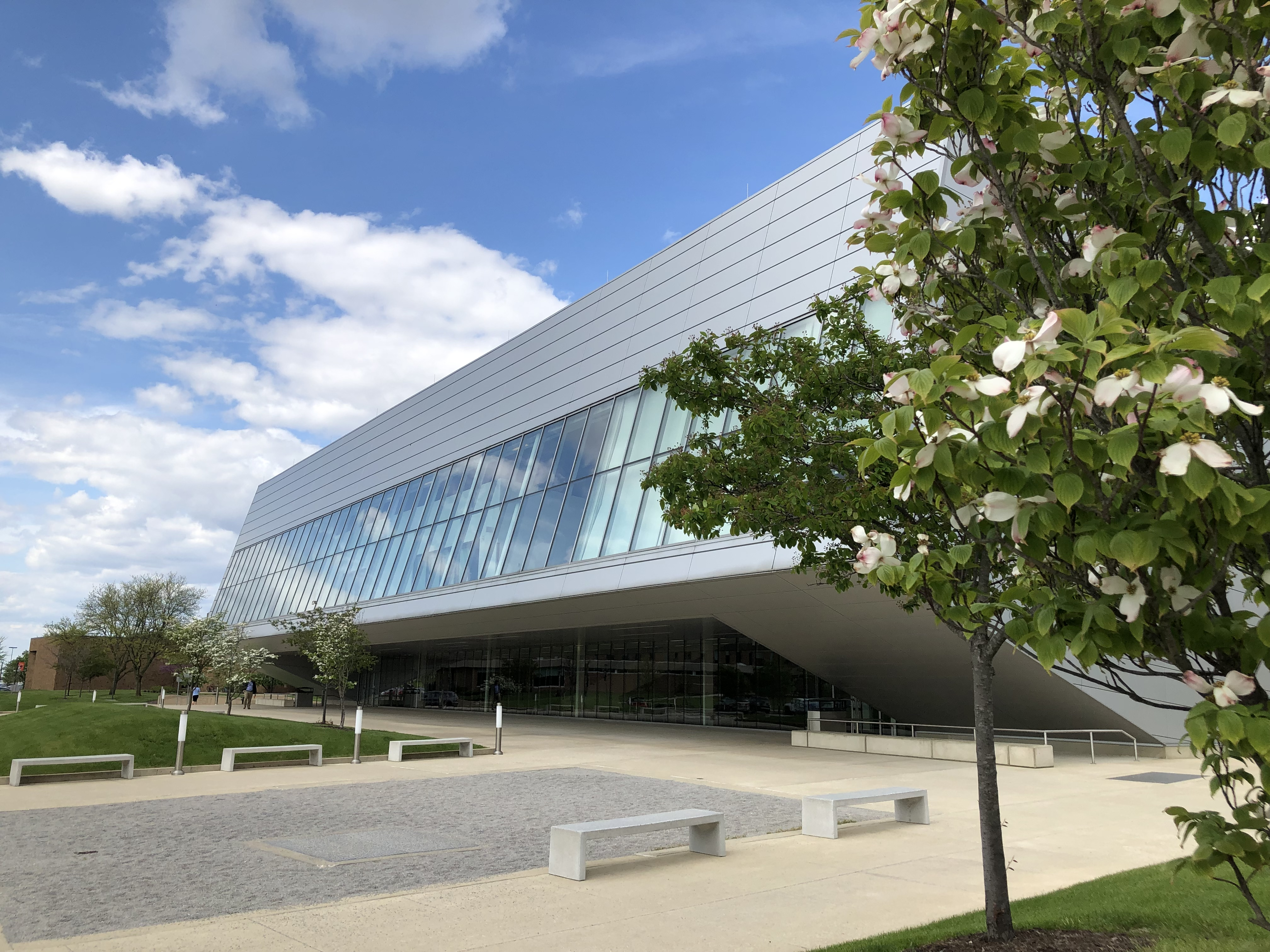
Wolfe Center

In January 2009, Craig Edward Dykers of Snøhetta gave a speech on the architecture philosophy behind the building, whose construction was completed in 2011. The building houses the Eva Marie Saint theater. The building also houses a 300-seat proscenium theater. In 2018, 12 Roman mosaics housed in the building were returned to Zeugma, Commagene by the University after it came to light that the art dealer who sold the pieces in 1965 had provided incorrect information regarding their origin. The Mosaics had previously been thought to have been excavated from the city of Antioch, and depicted Dionysus, Silenus, and a satyr. The building uses a partial green roof to reduce the effect of the Urban heat island.

=== Falcon Heights ===
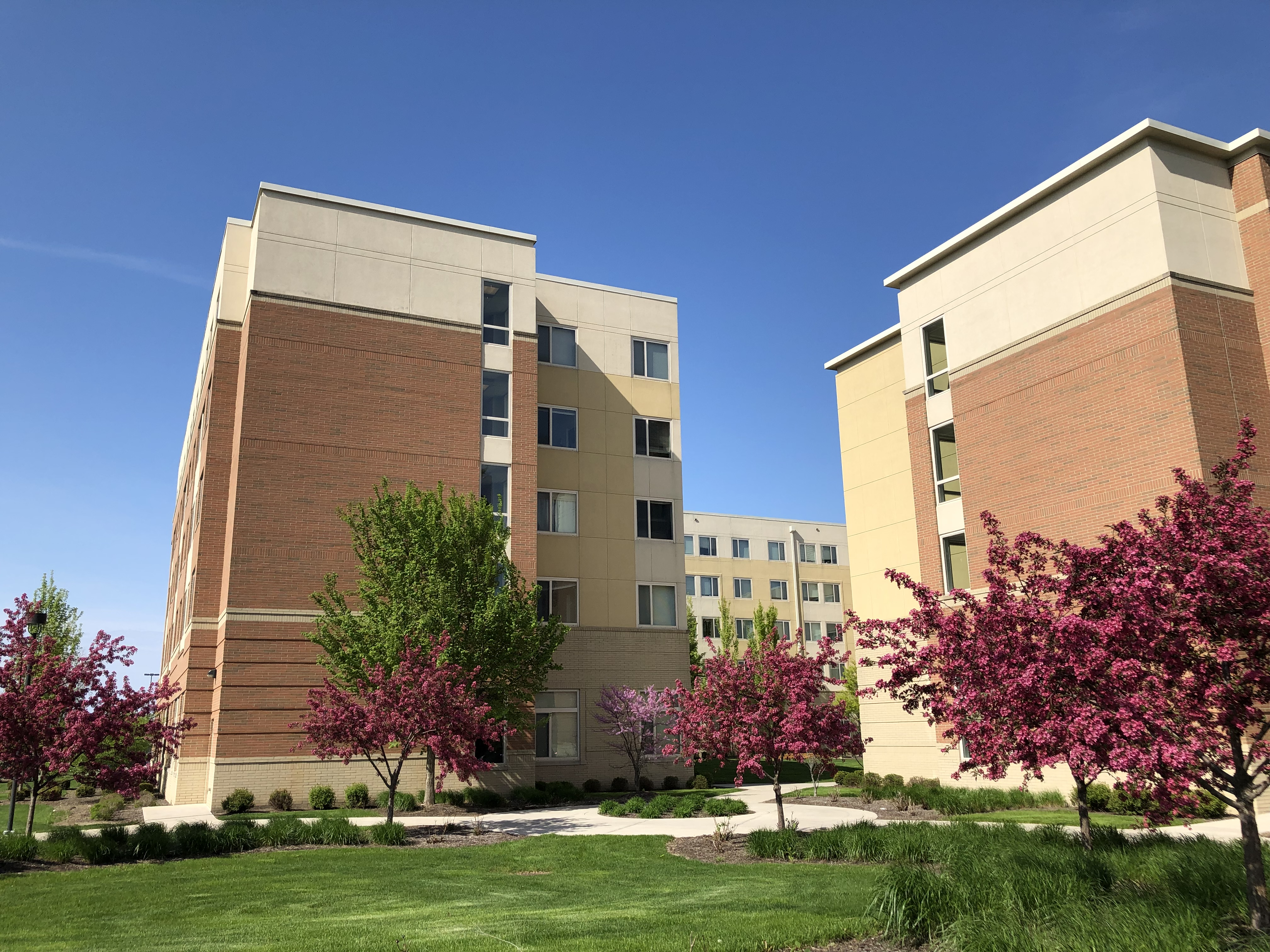
Falcon Heights

A Residence Hall built in 2011 with a capacity of 646 students. Named after a WWII era housing complex.

=== Centennial Hall ===
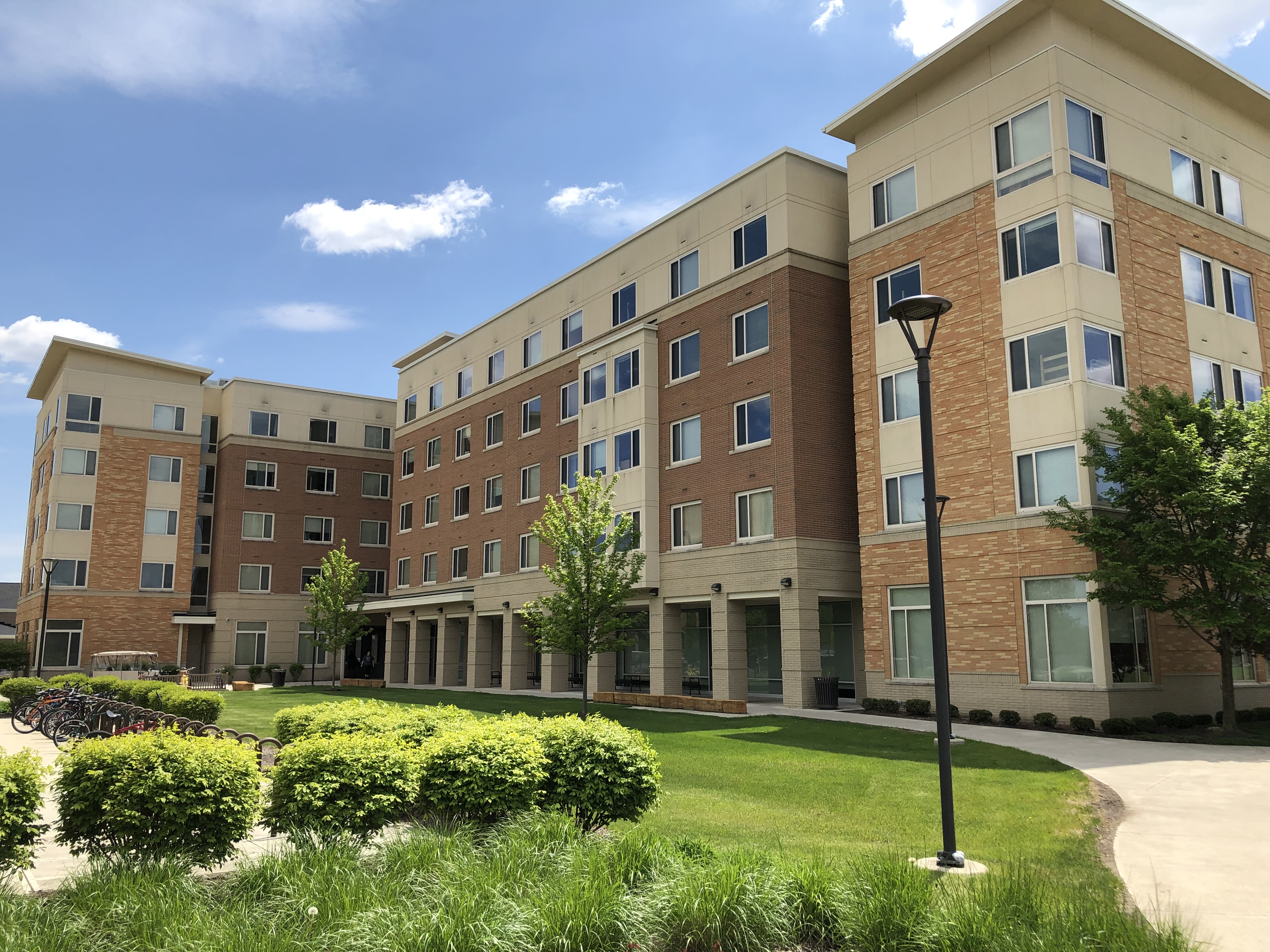
Centennial Hall

A residence hall built in 2011 with a capacity of 664 students. A student naming competition resulted in the hall being named for the 100th anniversary of the university.

=== The Oaks Dining Center ===
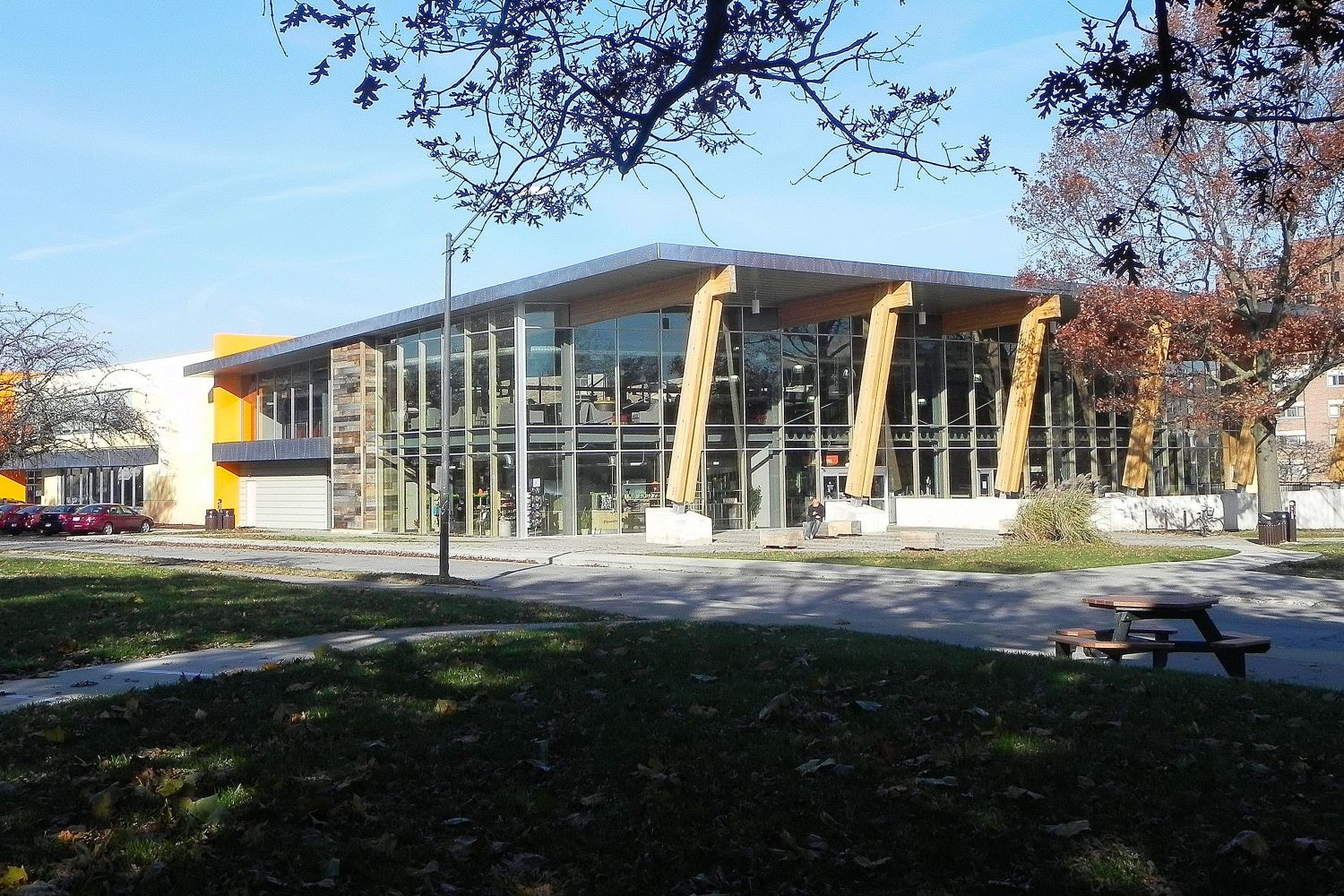
The Oaks Dining Center

Built in 2011. A LEED Gold certified Dining Hall with a green roof and rainwater reclamation systems. The location of the Oaks was chosen in part to attract more non-students from off campus as a way of reducing costs for students and increasing community engagement. In 2014, a vegan section was added to the dining hall. In 2017 a teaching kitchen was installed. In 2019 the University installed a hydroponic garden inside the dining hall.

=== Carillon Place Dining Center ===
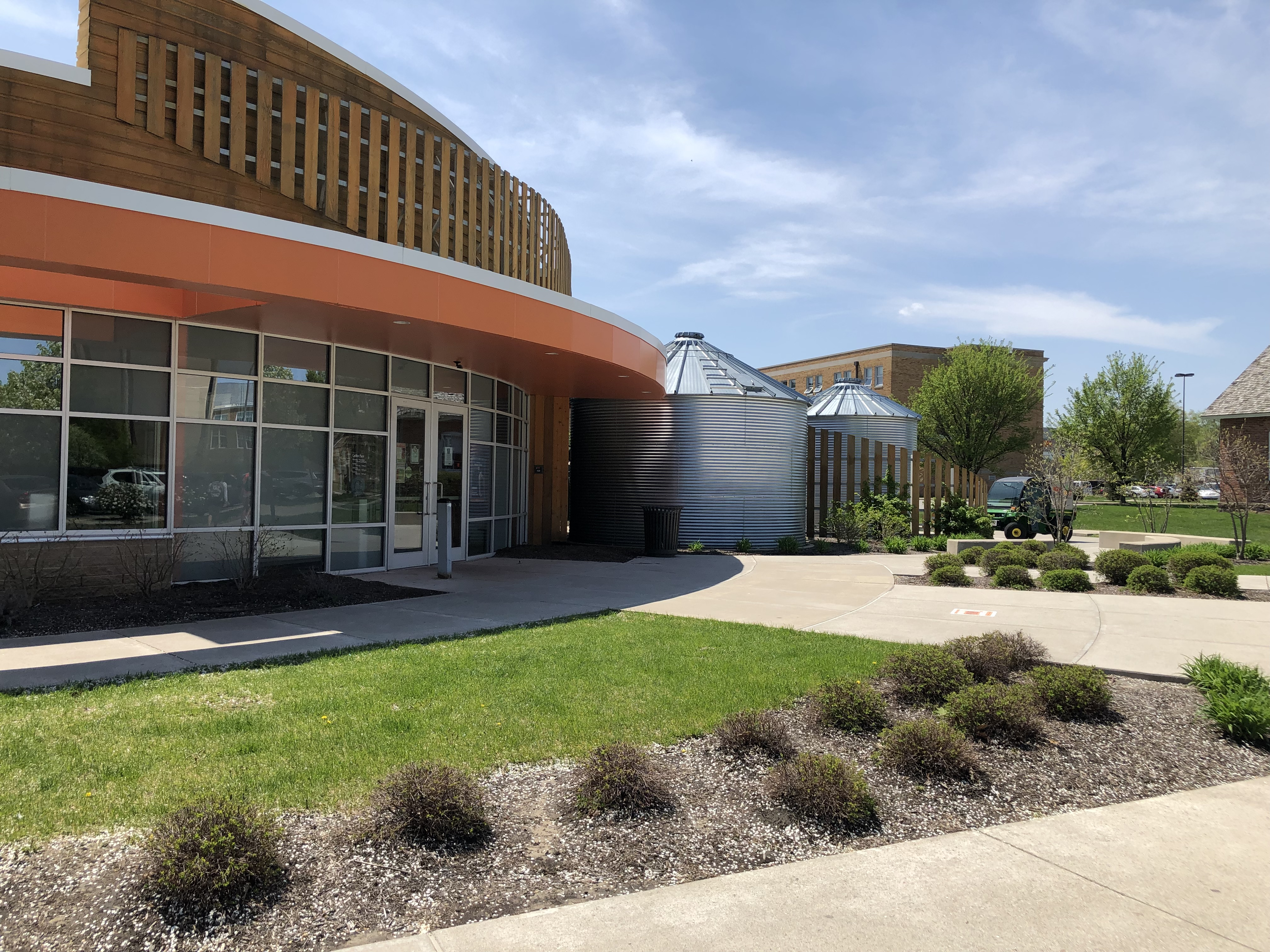
Carillon Place

A dining hall built in 2011. Features such as storm water reclamation earned it an LEED silver certification.

=== Stroh Center ===
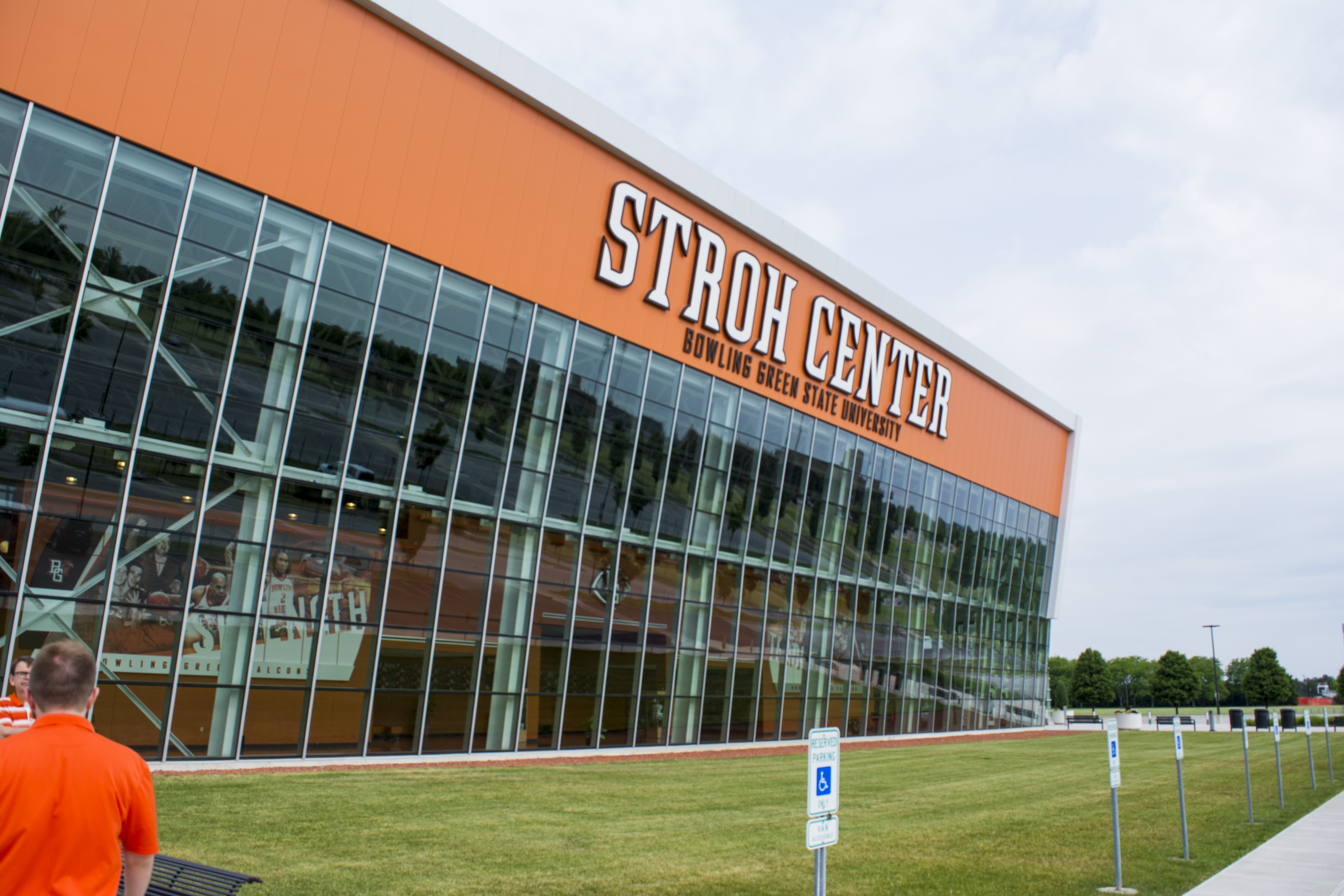
Stroh Center

The Stroh Center was built in 2011 as a basketball and volleyball venue. In September 2012 President Barack Obama held a campaign visit at the Stroh Center after flying in from the Toledo Express Airport.

=== Chiller Plant ===
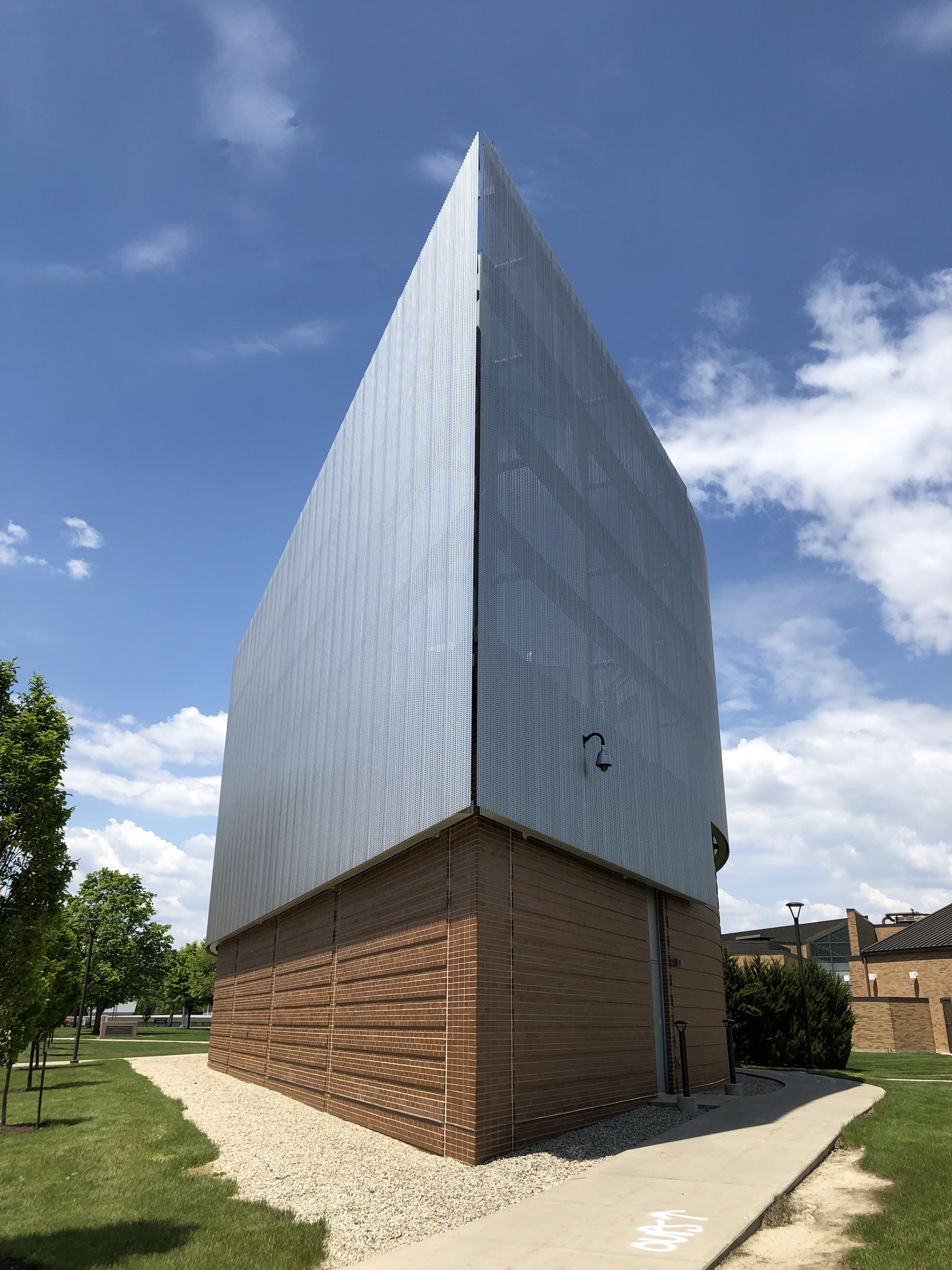
The Chiller Plant

Built in 2012 to provide district cooling to nearby academic buildings. The building was designed to have a low visual impact on campus while allowing for a high equipment density.

=== Falcon Health Center ===
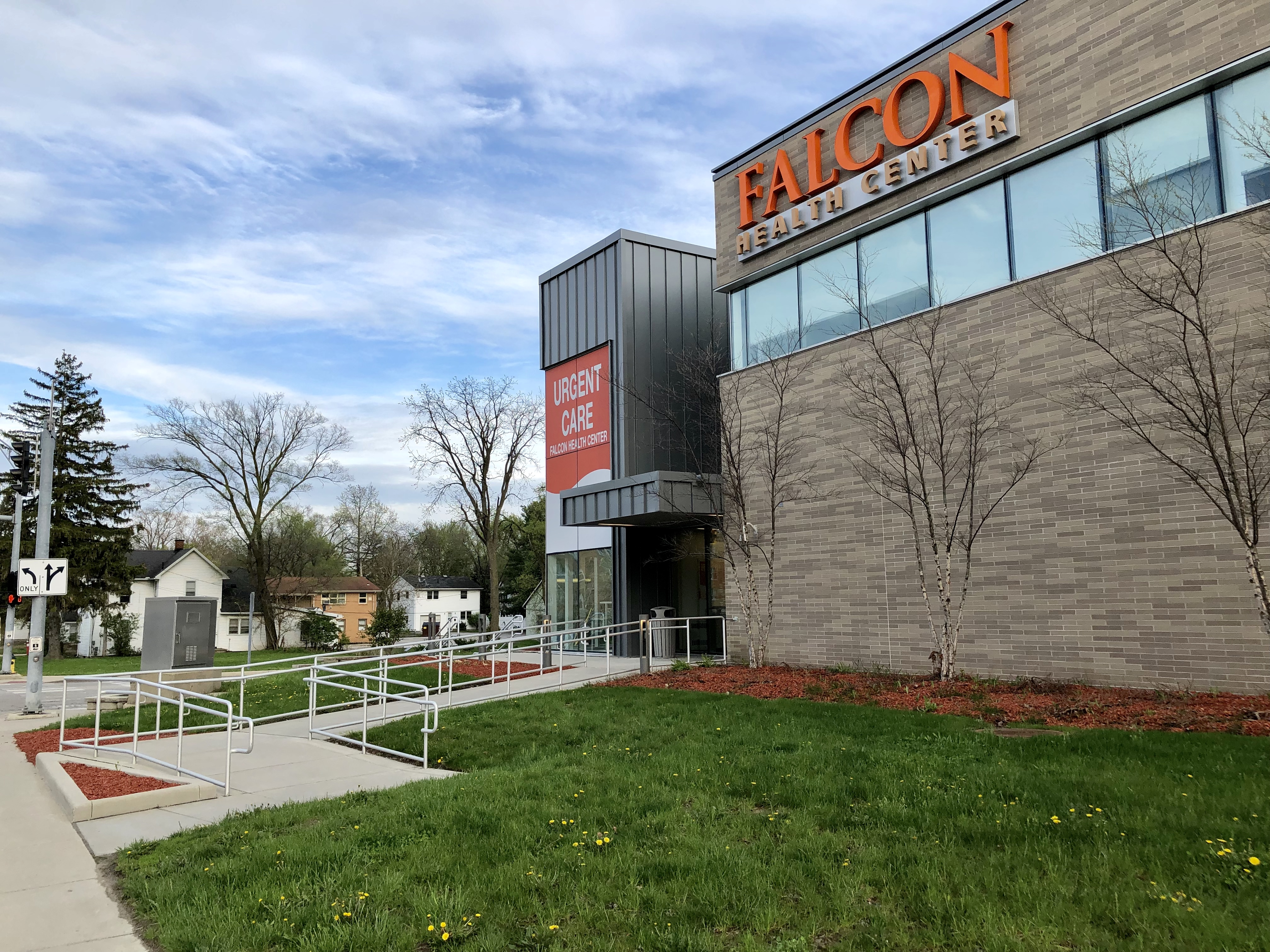
The Falcon Health Center

A clinic built in 2013 to expand healthcare services on campus by adding a drive through pharmacy and radiology services, as well as health insurance offices. The building was completely paid for by the Wood County Hospital and includes water run off systems and shade trees to reduce energy consumption. The center also hosts psychological services.

=== Ohio Bureau of Criminal Investigation Crime Lab ===
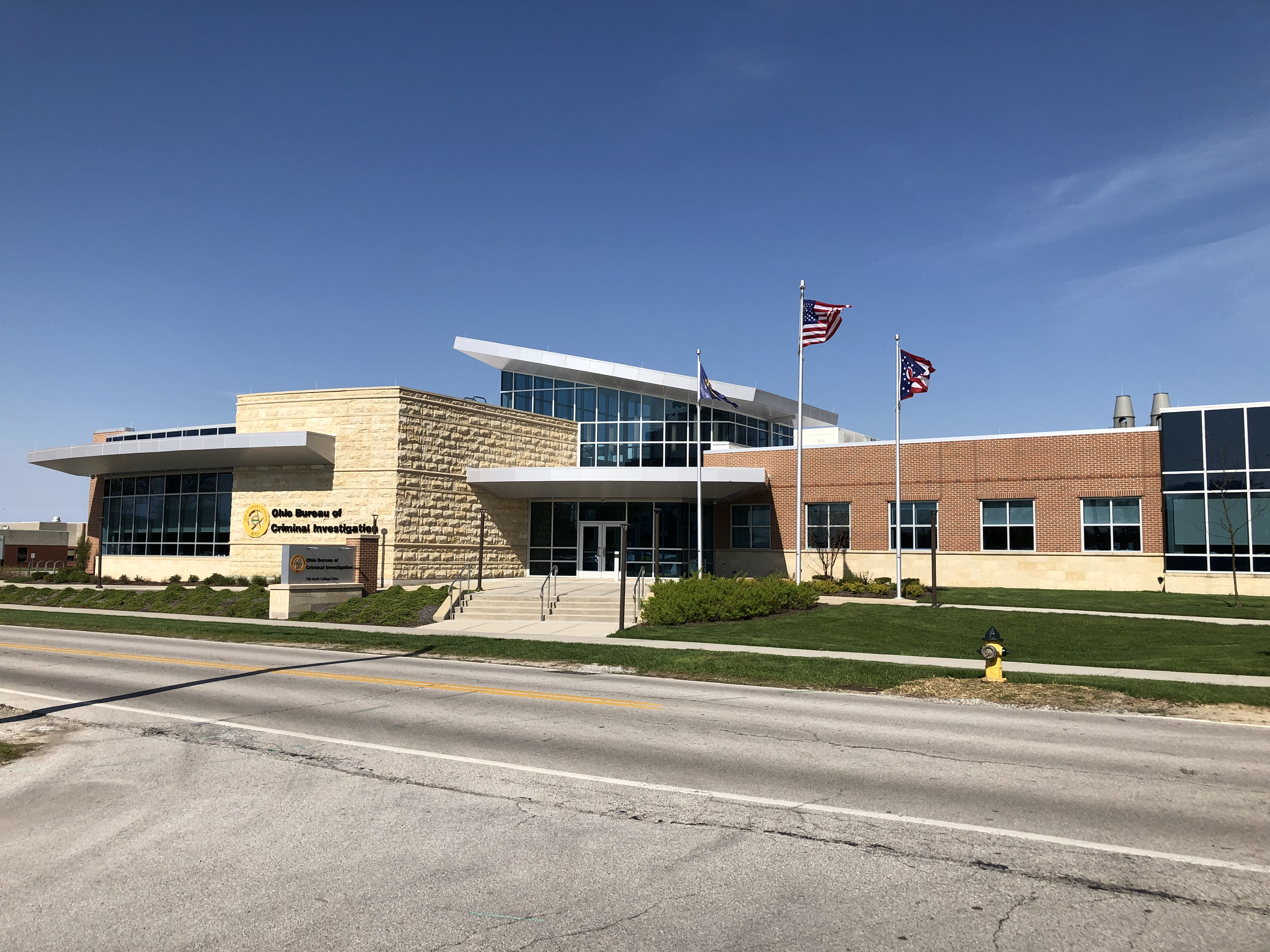

A 30,000 square foot building built in 2014 at a cost of $14 million to serve as a crime laboratory for the Ohio Bureau of Criminal Identification and Investigation. The office hosts laboratories for ballistic, chemical, biological, and fingerprint examination, as well as units including a Narcotics unit, a Crime scene unit, a criminal intelligence unit, a crimes against children unit, and a special investigative unit. The building earned LEED silver certification due to careful use of materials during construction, and a storm runoff system.

=== Bowling Green Flight Center ===
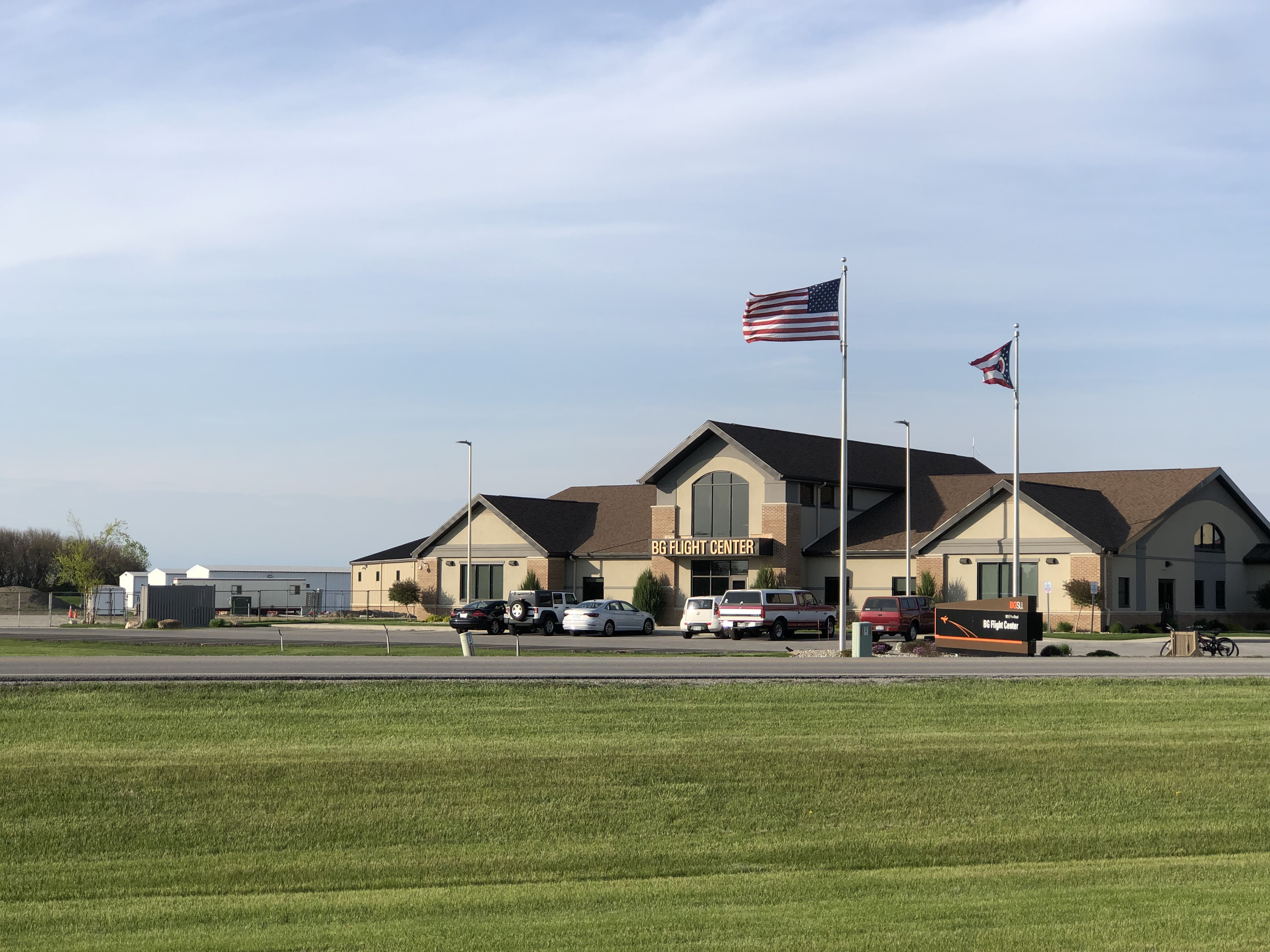

Built in 2015 on the grounds of the Wood County Regional Airport, it was built to replace an older building from 1945. Has classrooms, flight planning facilities, and a full flight simulator.

=== Greek Village ===
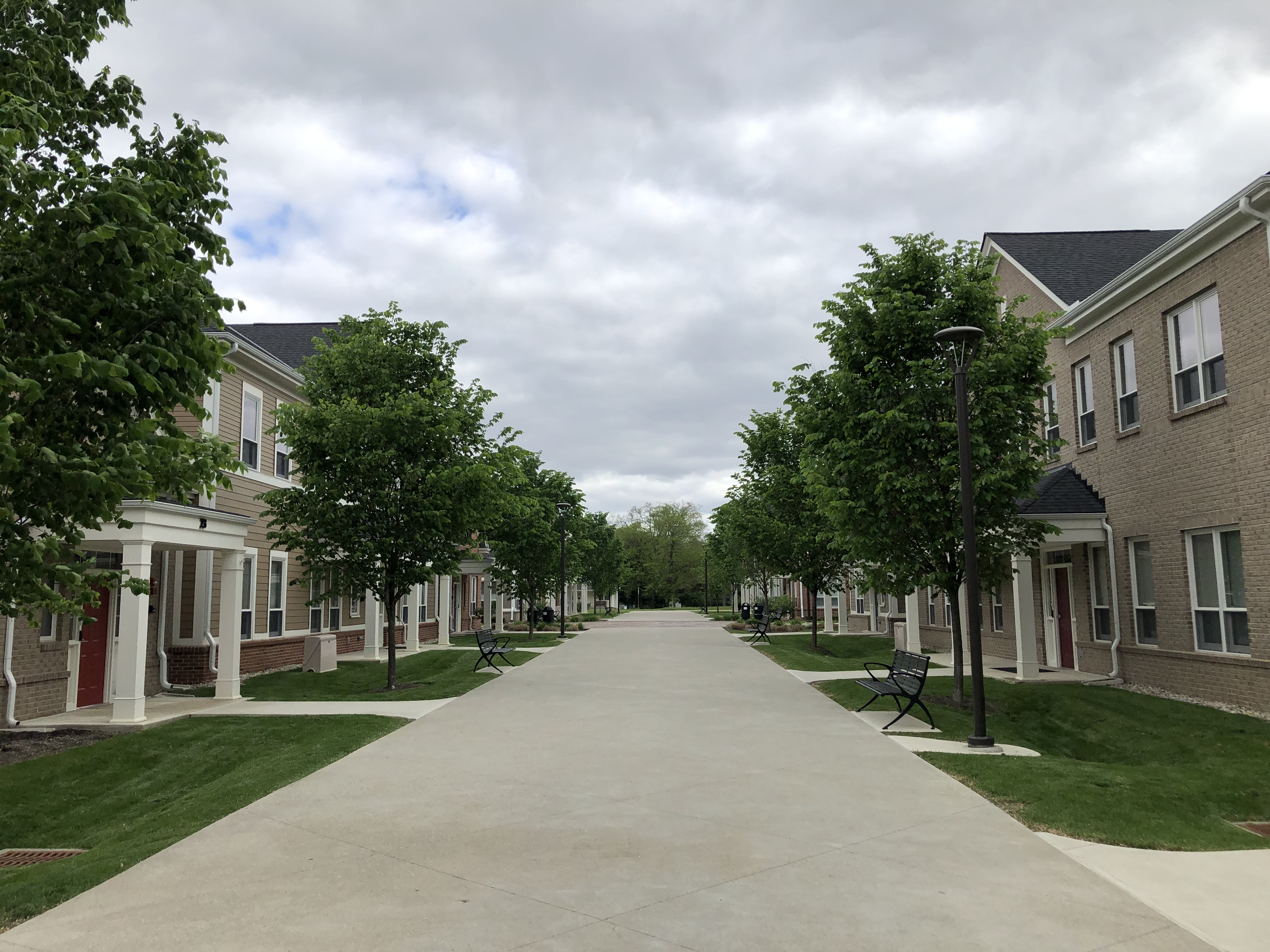

Replaced the former Fraternity and Sorority rows in 2016. The 33 buildings that form the village were built at a cost of 32.7 million dollars and are LEED Gold certified.

=== Park Avenue Building ===
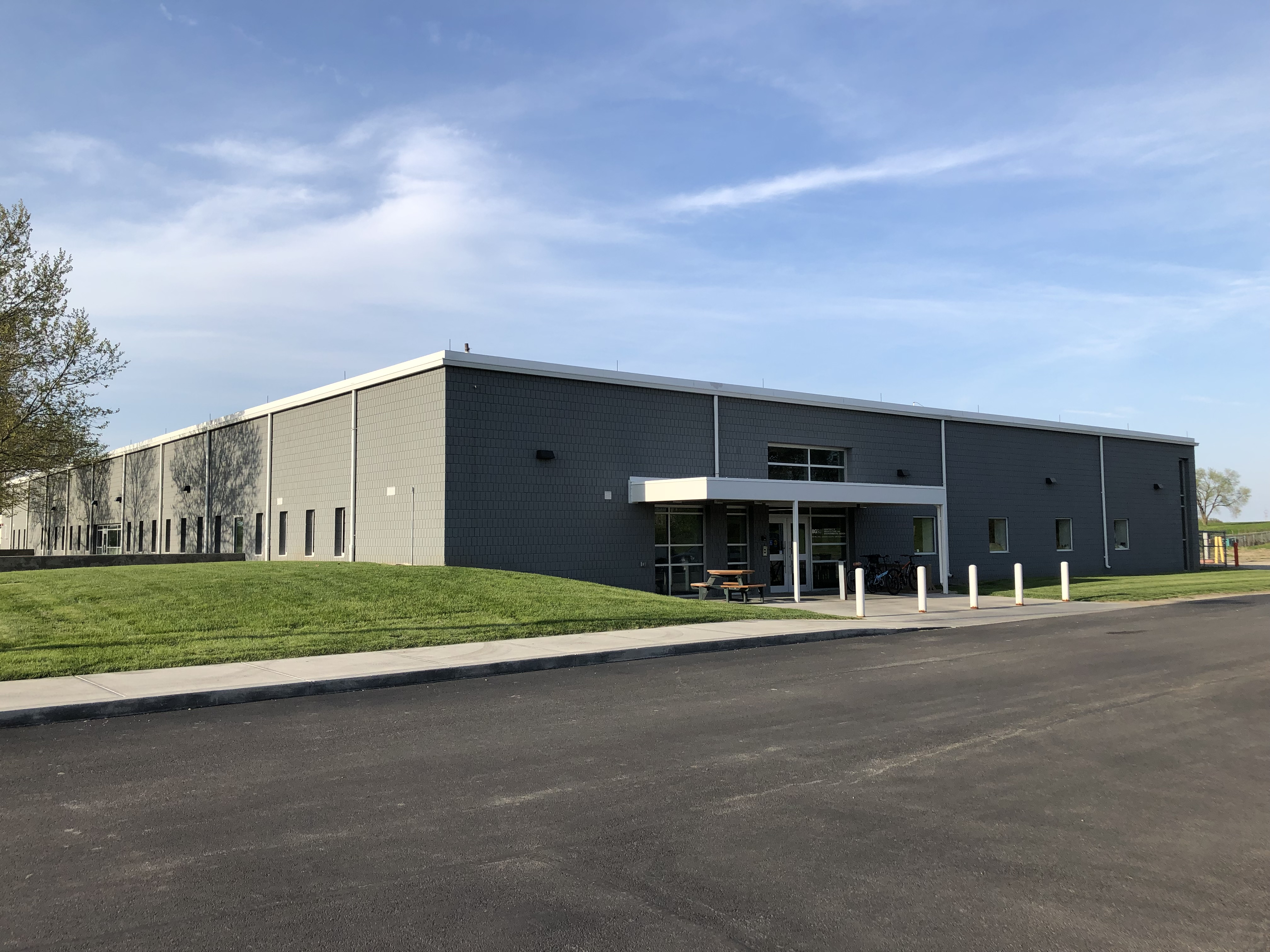

Formerly the Park Avenue Warehouse. Was renovated in 2016 at a cost of $4 million to house Architecture program facilities under one roof including a reference and materials library, gallery, studio space, plotters and laser cutters.

=== Huntington Building ===
A 34,931 square foot office building donated to the university by Huntington Bank in 2009 after it acquired the building from Sky Bank. Renovated in 2016, earning it a LEED silver rating.

=== Biology Greenhouse ===
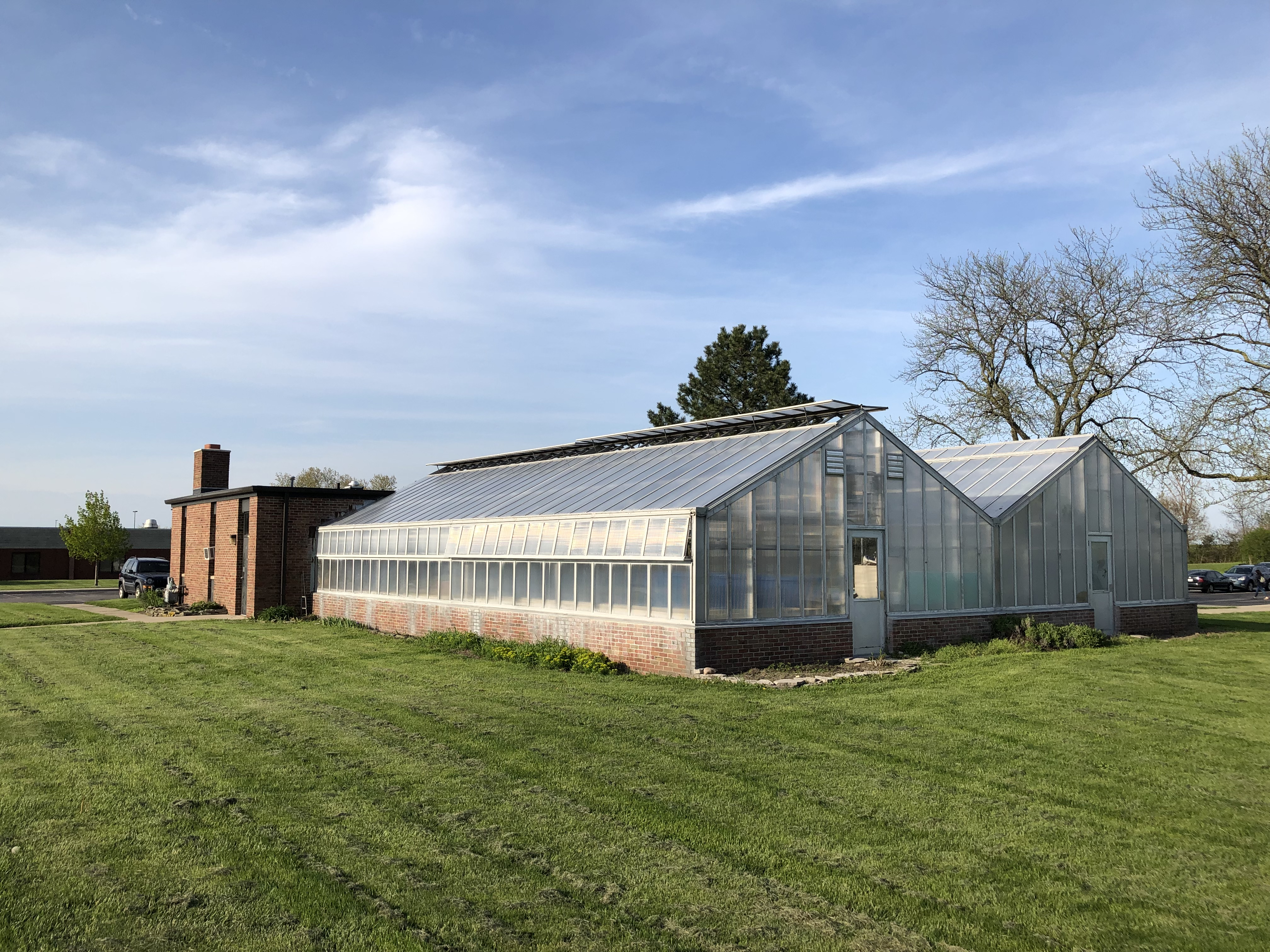

Contains a tropical flora greenhouse, a desert flora greenhouse, and two research rooms used for aquaponics experiments.

== BGSU at Levis Commons ==
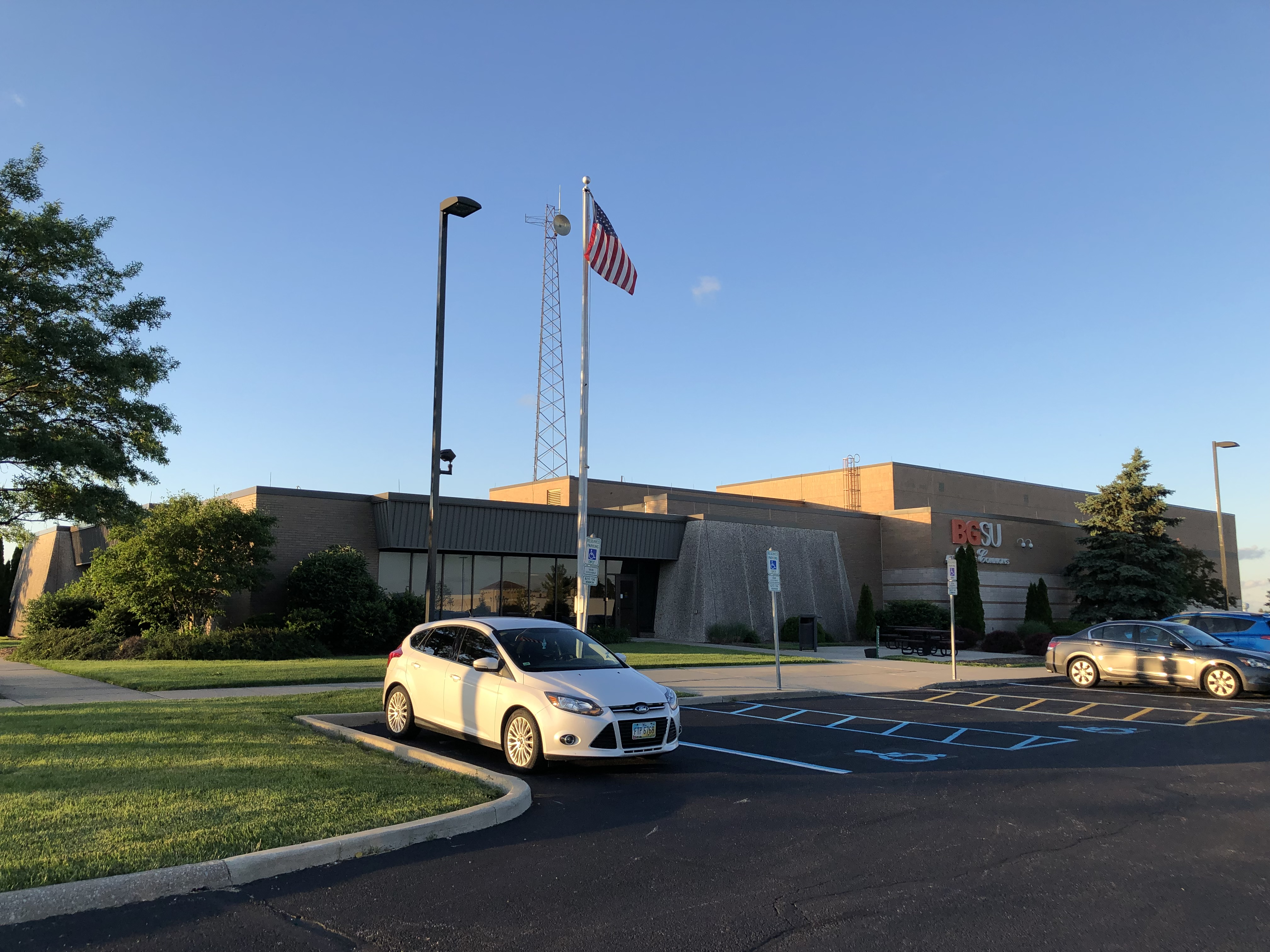
BGSU at Levis Commons

BGSU at Levis commons hosts meeting spaces and also houses the Northwest Ohio Regional Book Depository which is operated jointly by the University of Toledo to house books in a high density facility. The NWORBD hosts 1.8 million volumes of books. During the 2020 Coronavirus pandemic in Ohio the facility was used to house blood drives for the American Red Cross.

== BGSU Firelands ==
Buildings on the BGSU Firelands campus include Foundation Hall, The North Building, George Mylander Hall, and the Cedar Point center.

=== Foundation Hall ===
Built in 1968 as East Hall. The second floor houses the Firelands library.

=== George Mylander Hall ===
Built in 1968 as West Hall, this 61,000 square foot building was rededicated and renovated in 2014. Houses the Firelands Symphony Orchestra.

=== North Building ===
Built in 1972 to accommodate student activities, as well as house engineering and computing equipment.

=== Cedar Point Center ===
Built in June 2003 at a cost of $5.958 million. A two-story 30,000 square foot classroom building and meeting center.
