= List of Basque mythological figures =

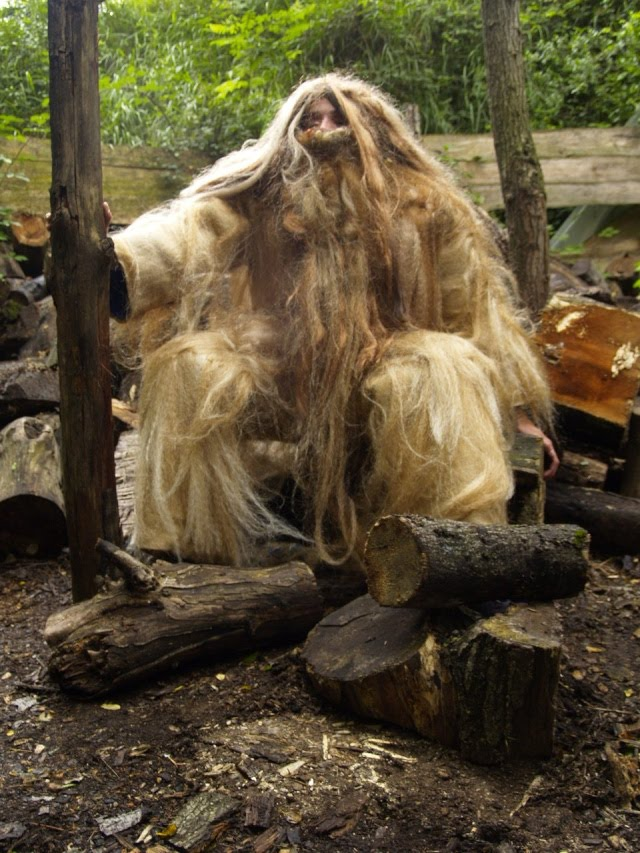
Basajaun, the wild man of the woods

The following is a list of gods, goddesses and many other divine and semi-divine figures and creatures from ancient Basque mythology.

== Deities ==
- Aide, a minor goddess of wind and air.
- Amalur, the goddess of the earth.
- Eate, the god of storms, sometimes associated with fire and ice.
- Egoi, a minor wind deity, associated with the south wind.
- Eki, the goddess of the Sun, the daughter of Amalur.
- Ilargi, the goddess of the Moon, also a daughter of Amalur.
- Inguma, the malevolent god of dreams and nightmares.
- Mari, a mother goddess, and wife of the deity Sugaar.
- Orko, the god of thunder.
- Sugaar, the god of storms and thunder, and the husband of Mari. He is normally imagined as a dragon or serpent.

== Spirits and other figures ==
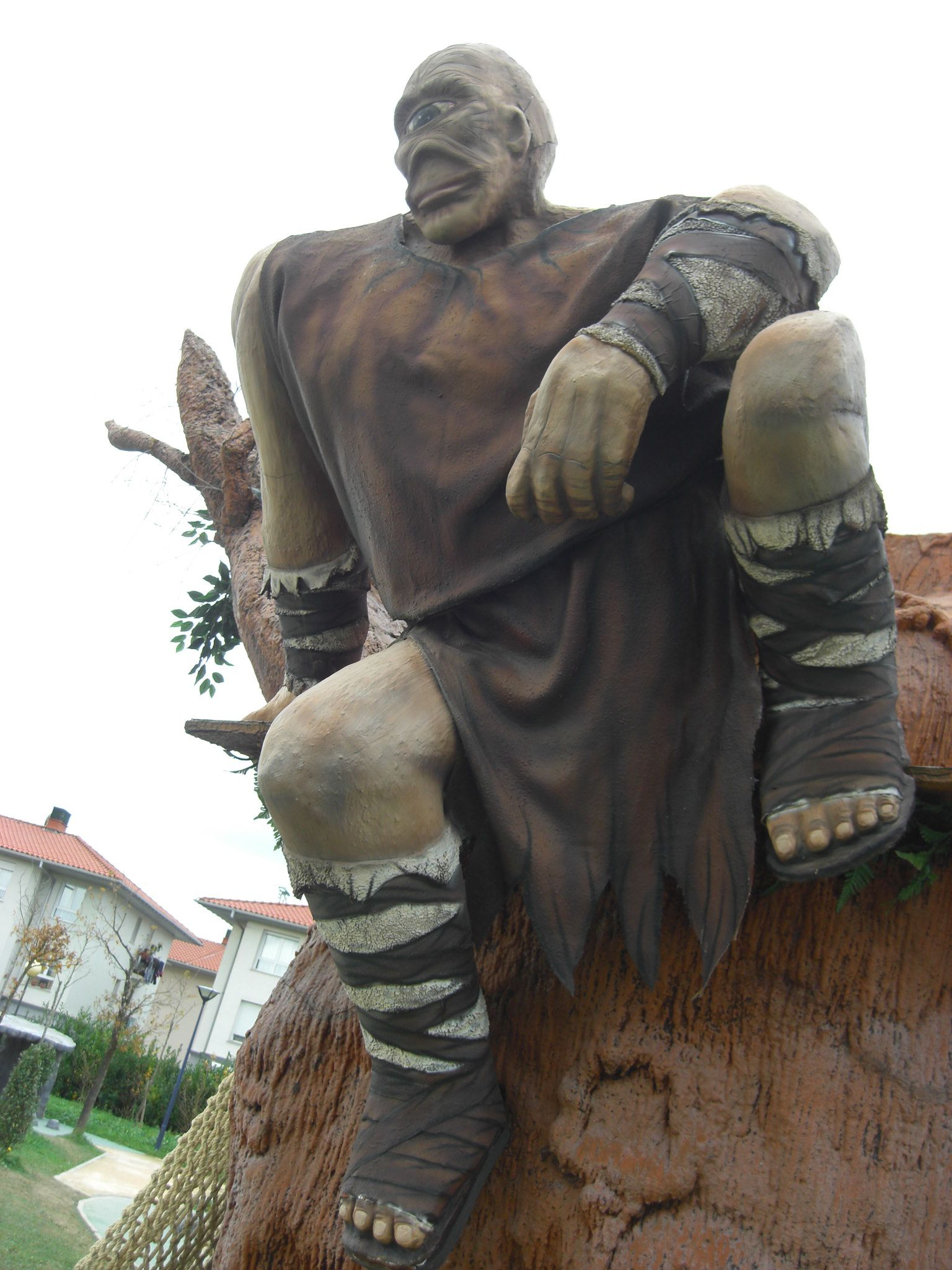
Tartalo, the Basque cyclops

- Aatxe, a cave-dwelling spirit who adopts the form of a young red bull, but being a shapeshifter, sometimes takes the shape of a man.
- Akerbeltz, demonic spirit in the form of a billy goat.
- Basajaun, the wild man of the woods.
- Gaizkiñ, an evil spirit that causes diseases.
- Gaueko, an evil spirit that comes out at night.
- Herensuge, a dragon who plays an important role in a few legends.
- Iratxoak, Basque imps, which can be helpful or mischievous depending on how well one treats them.
- Jean de l'Ours, a man born to a woman and a bear.
- Jentilak, giants sometimes portrayed throwing rocks at churches.
- Lamiak, nymphs with bird feet that dwell in rivers and springs.
- Mairuak, giants who build stone circles.
- Odei, nature spirit of thunder and the personification of storm clouds.
- Olentzero, a jentil, the Basque equivalent of Santa Claus.
- San Martin Txiki, popular Christian trickster figure.
- Sorginak, handmaidens and assistants of the goddess Mari.
- Tartalo, the Basque equivalent of the Greco-Roman Cyclops.
