= List of deities by classification =

Index to deities

This is an index to deities of the different religions, cultures and mythologies of the world, listed by type of deity.

== Motif-index ==
A basic classification of the types of gods as based on the Motif-Index of Folk-Literature, by Stith Thompson:

- A0 Creator
- A100—A199. The gods in general
  - A101. Supreme God
  - A104. The Making of the Gods
  - A107. Gods of Darkness and Light (darkness thought of as evil and light as good).
  - A109.1. Triple deity
  - A116. Triplet gods
  - A111.1. Mother of the gods
  - A111.2. Father of the Gods
  - A117.5. Gods as spirits of the deified dead
  - A131. Gods with animal features
    - A132.3. Equine god / goddess
    - A132.5. Bear god / goddess
    - A132.9. Cattle god / goddess
  - A161.2. King of the Gods
  - A177.1. Gods as Dupe or Tricksters
  - A192. Death or departure of the gods
  - A193. Gods of Dying-and-rising
- A200—A299. Gods of the Upper World
  - A210. Gods of the Sky
  - A220. Gods of the Sun
  - A240. Gods of the Moon
  - A250. Gods of the Stars
  - A260. Gods of Light
  - A270. Gods of the Dawn
  - A280. Gods of the Weather
    - A281. Gods of Storms
    - A282. Gods of the Wind
    - A284. Gods of Thunder
    - A287. Gods of Rain
- A300—A399. Gods of the Underworld
  - A310. God of the World of the Dead
  - A311. Conductor of the Dead
- A400—A499. Gods of the Earth (The Human Sphere)
  - A400. Gods of the Earth
  - A401. Mother Earth
  - A405. Gods of Nature
  - A410. Local Gods
  - A411. Gods of the Hearth and Household
  - A415. Gods of Clans or Nations
  - A420. Gods of Water
  - A430. Gods of Vegetation
  - A431. Gods of Fertility
  - A435. Gods of Trees and Forests
  - A440. Gods of Animals
  - A450. Gods of Trades and Professions
    - A451. Artisan Gods
    - A452. Gods of Hunting
    - A454. Gods of Healing
  - A460. Gods of Abstractions (also Z110. Abstractions personified)
    - A461. Gods of Wisdom
    - A463. Gods of Fate
      - A463.1. the Fates (goddesses who preside over the fates of men)
    - A464. Gods of Justice
    - A465. Gods of the Arts
    - A472. Gods of Sleep
    - A473. Gods of Wealth
    - A475. Gods of Love and Lust
    - A484. Gods of Oaths
    - A485. Gods of War
    - A486. the Furies (goddesses of vengeance)
    - A487. Gods of Death
  - A490. Miscellaneous Gods of the Earth
    - A491. God of Travellers
    - A493. Gods of Fire
- A500—A599. Demigods and Culture Heroes
  - A502. Heroes or demigods as fourth race of men.
  - A510. Origin of the culture hero (demigod).
  - A515.1.1. Twin culture heroes.
  - A521. Culture hero as dupe or trickster.
  - A531. Culture hero (demigod) overcomes monsters.

== Other deities by association ==
- Gods of Chaos
- Gods of Doorways and Thresholds
- Gods of the Night
- Queen of Heaven
- Gods of Smithing
- Gods of wine and beer / Goddess
- Gods of poppy

== Other classifications ==
- Apotheosis
- Avatar
- Death
- Deified heroes
- Divine Council
- Horned deity
- Imperial Cult
- Incarnation
- Master of Animals / Potnia Theron
- Mother Nature
- Reincarnation / Rebirth
- Sacred king
- Son of God
- Theophany
- Tutelary deity

== Related concepts ==
- Legendary creature
  - Hybrid
    - Human hybrid
- Liminal being
- Pantheon
- Spirit
  - Angel
  - Demon / Devil
    - Demonology / Archdemon
  - Fairy
  - Geist
  - Ghost
  - Soul
  - Water spirit

=== Lists ===
- Demigods
- Demons
  - Spirits in grimoires
- Ghosts
- Goddesses
- Legendary creatures
- Pantheons

== See also ==
- Religious cosmology
