= Australian Aboriginal astronomy =

Aboriginal Australian culture relating to astronomical subjects

Australian Aboriginal astronomy has been passed down orally, through ceremonies, and in their artwork of many kinds. The astronomical systems passed down thus show a depth of understanding of the movement of celestial objects which allowed them to use them as a practical means for creating calendars and for navigating across the continent and waters of Australia. There is a diversity of astronomical traditions in Australia, each with its own particular expression of cosmology. However, there appear to be common themes and systems between the groups. Due to the long history of Australian Aboriginal astronomy, the Aboriginal peoples have been described as "world's first astronomers" on several occasions.

Many of the constellations were given names based on their shapes, just as traditional western astronomy does, such as the Pleiades, Orion and the Milky Way, with others, such as Emu in the Sky, describes the dark patches rather than the points lit by the stars. Contemporary Indigenous Australian art often references astronomical subjects and their related lore, such as the Seven Sisters.

== Records of Aboriginal astronomy ==
One of the earliest written records of Aboriginal astronomy was made by William Edward Stanbridge, an Englishman who emigrated to Australia in 1841 and befriended the local Boorong people.

== Interpreting the sky ==
=== Emu in the sky ===
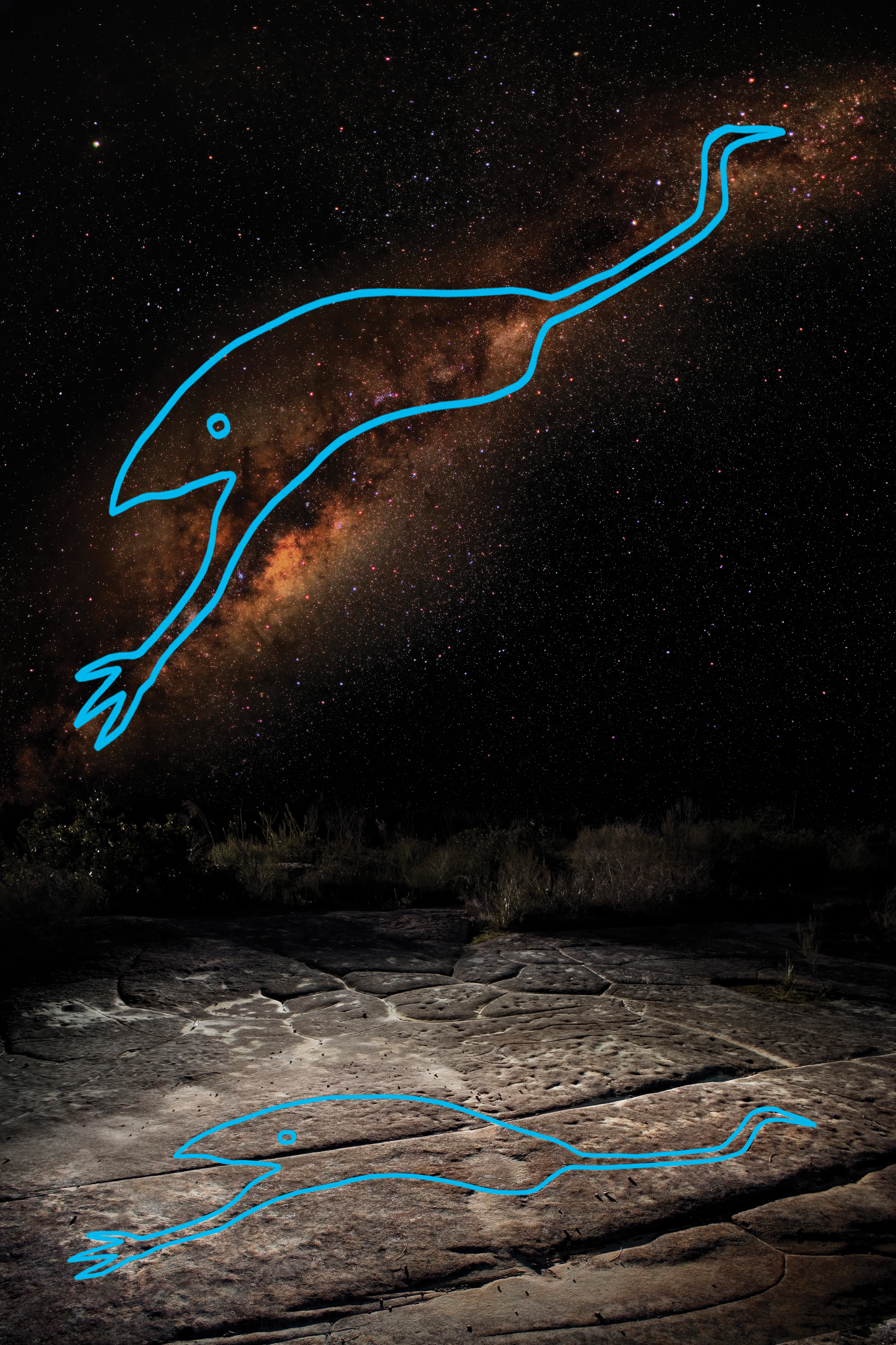
The Aboriginal "Emu in the sky". In Western astronomy terms, the Southern Cross is on the right, and Scorpius on the left; the head of the emu is the Coalsack.

A constellation used almost everywhere in Australian Aboriginal culture is the "Emu in the Sky", which consists of dark nebulae (opaque clouds of dust and gas in outer space) that are visible against the (centre and other sectors of the) Milky Way background. The Emu's head is the very dark Coalsack Nebula, next to the Southern Cross; the body and legs are that extension of the Great Rift trailing out to Scorpius.

In Ku-ring-gai Chase National Park, north of Sydney, are extensive rock engravings of the Guringai people who lived there, including representations of the creator-hero Daramulan and his emu-wife. An engraving near the Elvina Track shows an emu in the same pose and orientation as the Emu in the Sky constellation.

To the Wardaman, however, the Coalsack is the head of a lawman.

Bruce Pascoe's 2014 book Dark Emu takes its title from one of the Aboriginal names for the constellation, known as Gugurmin to the Wiradjuri people.

In May 2020, the Royal Australian Mint launched a limited edition commemorative one-dollar coin, as the first in its "Star Dreaming" series celebrating Indigenous Australians' astrology.

=== Canoe in Orion ===
The Yolŋu people of northern Australia say that the constellation of Orion, which they call Julpan (or Djulpan), is a canoe. They tell the story of three brothers who went fishing, and one of them ate a sawfish that was forbidden under their law. Seeing this, the Sun-woman, Walu, made a waterspout that carried him and his two brothers and their canoe up into the sky. The three stars that line in the constellation's centre, which form Orion's Belt in Western mythology, are the three brothers; the Orion Nebula above them is the forbidden fish; and the bright stars Betelgeuse and Rigel are the bow and stern of the canoe. This is an example of astronomical legends underpinning the ethical and social codes that people use on Earth.

=== Seven Sisters ===
The Pleiades constellation figures in the Dreamings and songlines of several Aboriginal Australian peoples, usually referred to as the seven sisters. The story has been described as "one of the most defining and predominant meta-narratives chronicled in ancient mainland Australia", which describes a male ancestral being (with names including Wati Nyiru, Yurlu and others) who pursues seven sisters across the middle of the Australian continent from west to east, where the sisters turn into stars. Told by a number of peoples across the country, using varying names for the characters, it starts in Martu country in the Pilbara region of Western Australia (specifically, Roebourne), and travels across the lands of the Ngaanyatjarra (WA) to (Anangu Pitjantjatjara Yankunytjatjara, or APY lands, of South Australia, where the Pitjantjatjara and Yankunytjatjara peoples live. The story also includes Warlpiri lands, the Tanami Desert of the Northern Territory.

The Yamatji people of the Wajarri language group, of the Murchison region in Western Australia, call the sisters Nyarluwarri. When the constellation is close to the horizon as the sun is setting, the people know that it is the right time to harvest emu eggs, and they also use the brightness of the stars to predict seasonal rainfall.

In the Kimberley region of Western Australia, the eagle hawk chases the seven sisters up into the sky, where they become the star cluster and he becomes the Southern Cross.

In the Western Desert cultural bloc in central Australia, they are said to be seven sisters fleeing from the unwelcome attentions of a man represented by some of the stars in Orion, the hunter. In these stories, the man is called Nyiru or Nirunja, and the Seven Sisters is songline known as Kungkarangkalpa. The seven sisters story often features in the artwork of the region, such as the 2017 painting by Tjungkara Ken, Kaylene Whiskey's 2018 work "Seven Sistas", and the large-scale installation by the Tjanpi Desert Weavers commissioned as a feature of the National Gallery of Australia's 2020 Know My Name Exhibition. The Museum of Contemporary Art Australia in Sydney holds a 2013 work by the Tjanpi Desert Weavers called Minyma Punu Kungkarangkalpa (Seven Sisters Tree Women). In March 2013, senior desert dancers from the APY Lands (South Australia) in collaboration with the Australian National University's ARC Linkage and mounted by artistic director Wesley Enoch, performed Kungkarangkalpa: The Seven Sisters Songline on the shores of Lake Burley Griffin in Canberra.

In the Warlpiri version of the story, the Napaljarri sisters are often represented carrying a man called Wardilyka, who is in love with the women. But the morning star, Jukurra-jukurra, a man from a different skin group and who is also in love with the sisters, chases them across the sky. Each night they launch themselves into the sky, and each night he follows them. This story is known as the Napaljarri-warnu Jukurrpa.

The people of around Lake Eyre in South Australia tell how the ancestor male is prevented from capturing one of the seven sisters by a great flood.

The Wirangu people of the west coast of South Australia have a creation story embodied in a songline of great significance based on the Pleiades. In the story, the hunter (the Orion constellation) is named Tgilby. Tgilby, after falling in love with the seven sisters, known as Yugarilya, chases them out of the sky, onto and across the earth. He chases them as the Yugarilya chase a snake, Dyunu.

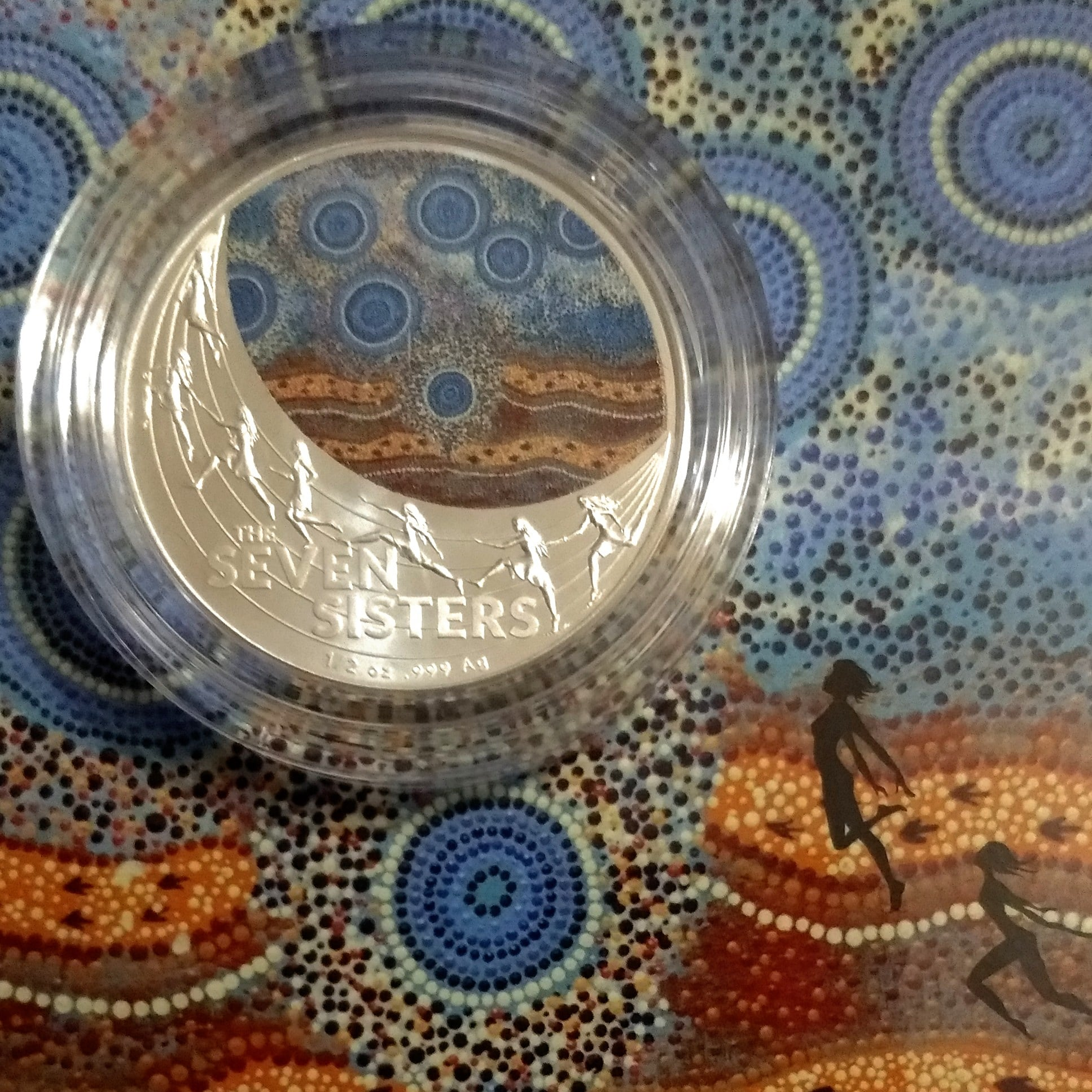
1 dollar commemorative coin issued in 2020 by the Royal Australian Mint, with the seven sisters on the reverse

The Boonwurrung people of the Kulin nation of Victoria tell the Karatgurk story, which tells of how a crow robbed the seven sisters of their secret of how to make fire, thus bringing the skill to the people on earth.

In another story, told by peoples of New South Wales, the seven sisters are beautiful women known as the Maya-Mayi, two of whom are kidnapped by a warrior, Warrumma, or Warunna. They eventually escape by climbing a pine tree that continually grows up into the sky where they join their other sisters.

In 2017, a major exhibition entitled Songlines: Tracking the Seven Sisters was mounted at the National Museum of Australia, afterwards travelling to Berlin (2022) and Paris (2023).

In September 2020, the Royal Australian Mint issued its second commemorative one-dollar coin in its "Star Dreaming" series celebrating Indigenous Australians' astrology (see Emu in the sky above).

=== The Milky Way ===
The Kaurna people of the Adelaide Plains of South Australia called the (centre and other sectors of) the Milky Way wodliparri in the Kaurna language, meaning "house river". They believed that Karrawirra Parri (the River Torrens) was a reflection of wodliparri.

The Yolŋu people believe that when they die, they are taken by a mystical canoe, Larrpan, to the spirit-island Baralku in the sky, where their camp-fires can be seen burning along the edge of the great river of the Milky Way. The canoe is sent back to Earth as a shooting star, letting their family on Earth know that they have arrived safely in the spirit-land.

The Boorong people see in the Southern Cross a possum in a tree.

=== Sun and Moon ===
Many traditions have stories of a female Sun and a male Moon.

The Yolŋu say that Walu, the Sun-woman, lights a small fire each morning, which we see as the dawn. She paints herself with red ochre, some of which spills onto the clouds, creating the sunrise. She then lights a torch and carries it across the sky from east to west, creating daylight. At the end of her journey, as she descends from the sky, some of her ochre paints again rubs off onto the clouds, creating the sunset. She then puts out her torch, and throughout the night travels underground back to her starting camp in the east. Other Aboriginal peoples of the Northern Territory call her Wuriupranili. Other stories about the Sun involve Wala, Yhi, and Gnowee.

The Yolŋu tell that Ngalindi, the Moon-man, was once young and slim (the waxing Moon), but grew fat and lazy (the full Moon). His wives chopped bits off him with their axes (the waning Moon); to escape them he climbed a tall tree towards the Sun, but died from the wounds (the new Moon). After remaining dead for three days, he rose again to repeat the cycle, and continues doing so till this day. The Kuwema people in the Northern Territory say that he grows fat at each full Moon by devouring the spirits of those who disobey the tribal laws. Another story by the Aboriginals of Cape York involves the making of a giant boomerang that is thrown into the sky and becomes the Moon.

A story from Southern Victoria concerns a beautiful woman who is forced to live by herself in the sky after a number of scandalous affairs.

The Yolŋu also associated the Moon with the tides.

=== Eclipses ===
The Warlpiri people explain a solar eclipse as being the Sun-woman being hidden by the Moon-man as he makes love to her. This explanation is shared by other groups, such as the Wirangu.

In the Ku-ring-gai Chase National Park there are a number of engravings showing a crescent shape, with sharp horns pointing down, and below it a drawing of a man in front of a woman. While the crescent shape has been assumed by most researchers to represent a boomerang, some argue that it is more easily interpreted as a solar eclipse, with the mythical man-and-woman explanation depicted below it.

=== Venus ===
The rising of Venus marks an important ceremony of the Yolŋu, who call it Barnumbirr ("Morning Star and Evening Star"). They gather after sunset to await the rising of the planet. As she reappears (or in other nearby weeks appears only) in the early hours before dawn, the Yolŋu say that she draws behind her a rope of light attached to the island of Baralku on Earth, and along this rope, with the aid of a richly decorated "Morning Star Pole", the people are able to communicate with their dead loved ones, showing that they still love and remember them.

=== Jupiter ===
The Dja Dja Wurrung call Jupiter "Bunjil's campfire". The planet features in the Dja Dja Wurrung Aboriginal Clans Corporation logo, as a symbol of the Creator Spirit.

=== Eta Carinae ===
In 2010, astronomers Duane Hamacher and David Frew from Macquarie University in Sydney showed that the Boorong Aboriginal people of northwestern Victoria, Australia, witnessed the outburst of Eta Carinae in the 1840s and incorporated it into their oral traditions as Collowgulloric War, the wife of War (Canopus, the Crow – wɑː). This is the only definitive indigenous record of Eta Carinae's outburst identified in the literature to date.

== Astronomical calendars ==
Aboriginal calendars tend to differ from European calendars: many groups in northern Australia use a calendar with six seasons, and some groups mark the seasons by the stars which are visible during them. For the Pitjantjatjara, for example, the rising of the Pleiades at dawn (in May) marks the start of winter.

It is not known to what extent Aboriginal people were interested in the precise motion of the sun, moon, planets or stars. However, it likely that some of the stone arrangements in Victoria such as Wurdi Youang near Little River, Victoria, may have been used to predict and confirm the equinoxes and/or solstices. The arrangement is aligned with the setting sun at the solstices and equinox, but its age is unknown.

There are rock engravings by the Nganguraku people at Ngaut Ngaut which, according to oral tradition, represent lunar cycles. Most of their culture (including their language) has been lost because of the banning of such things by Christian missionaries before 1913.

Stories enrich a custom-linked calendar whereby the heliacal rising or setting of stars or constellations indicates to Aboriginal Australians when it is time to move to a new place and/or look for a new food source. For example, the Boorong people in Victoria know that when the Malleefowl (Lyra) disappears in October, to "sit with the Sun", it is time to start gathering her eggs on Earth. Other groups know that when Orion first appears in the sky, the dingo puppies are about to be born. When Scorpius appears, the Yolŋu know that the Macassan fisherman would soon arrive to fish for trepang.

== In contemporary culture ==
A great deal of contemporary Aboriginal art has an astronomical theme, reflecting the astronomical elements of the artists' cultures. Prominent examples are Gulumbu Yunupingu, Bill Yidumduma Harney, and Nami Maymuru, all of whom have won awards or been finalists in the Telstra Indigenous Art Awards. In 2009 an exhibition of Indigenous Astronomical Art from WA, named "Ilgarijiri", was launched at AIATSIS in Canberra in conjunction with a Symposium on Aboriginal Astronomy.

Other contemporary painters include the daughters of the late Clifford Possum Tjapaltjarri, who have the seven sisters as one of their Dreamings. Gabriella Possum and Michelle Possum paint the Seven Sisters Dreaming in their paintings. They inherited this Dreaming through their maternal line.

== See also ==
- Australian Aboriginal Astronomy Project
- Archaeoastronomy
- Indigenous Australian art
- List of archaeoastronomical sites by country
- Pleiades in folklore and literature
