= Bahloo =

Moon god in the native Australian mythology

In Gamilaraay mythology, Bahloo (Note: baaluu is the Yuwaalaraay for "moon".) is a male spirit representing the moon. The most known tale about him is a story about the origin of death.

== Myths ==
Bahloo and the Daens (Note: "Daen" is an old transcription of dhayn, Yuwaalaraay for "Aboriginal man" or "Aboriginal person".)

The most notable myth seeks to explain both man's mortality and the hatred between snakes and men, much as does the Judeo-Christian story of the Garden of Eden. In the tale, Bahloo takes his snakes (calling them his 'dogs') out for a walk at night. He comes upon a group of men and asks them to carry the snakes across a river for him. They were afraid, and refused, so he did it himself, with two snakes coiled around each arm and one around his neck. He threw a piece of bark on the water, which floated, and a stone, which sank. He declared that he was like the bark, always rising again, but that the men would be like the stone, and sink to the bottom when they were dead. The men, who had always feared the snakes, now hated them and killed them whenever they saw one. Bahloo always sent more, to remind the people that they had not done what he asked.

Bahloo and Wahn

One Aboriginal legend tells of how Bahloo was once a clever man who lived with Wahn, the Crow, and Buumayamayal, the fly catcher lizard, creating the babies of the world. One day, Wahn asks Bahloo, in addition to making new babies, that they resurrect the dead as well. Bahloo refused this request, making Wahn very upset. Upon seeing a large gum tree, Wahn asks to Bahloo climb the tree for grubs. He then breathed on the gum tree, causing it to grow into the sky. This is where Bahloo stayed, explaining why the Moon travels across the sky.

Bahloo and Yhi

During Bahloo’s travels, Yhi, the Sun, courts Bahloo, but he refused her advances. The myth says that this is why the Sun chased the Moon across the sky. Yhi threatened the spirits who held up the sky that if they let him escape down to Earth, she would plunge the world into darkness.

Nevertheless, Bahloo is sometimes seen walking on the Earth in Gamilaraay myth. He does so by disguising himself as the spirit emu, tricking the spirits and going back to Earth to once again reclaim his post of creating baby girls.

Yhi Brings Life to the World

In another story, Yhi gives Bahloo to the Morning Star as her husband; This is because Yhi created the Morning Star to herald her coming and felt sorry for the loneliness of the Star's station.
