= List of deities of wine and beer =

Deities of wine and beer include a number of agricultural deities associated with the fruits and grains used to produce alcoholic beverages, as well as the processes of fermentation and distillation.

- Abundantia - Roman goddess of abundance (see also: Habonde).
- Acan - Mayan god of alcohol.
- Accla - Incan female keepers of the sacred fires (who also brewed beer).
- Acratopotes - one of Dionysus' companions and a drinker of unmixed wine.
- Aegir - a Norse divinity associated with ale, beer and mead.
- Aizen Myō-ō - Shinto god of tavern keepers.
- Albina - Arcadian, British & Irish white barley goddess.
- Ampelos - Greek lover of Dionysus transformed into the grapevine.
- Amaethon - Welsh god of agriculture.
- Amphictyonis - Greek goddess of wine and friendship.
- Aristaeus - Greco-Roman god of rustic, rural arts, including making wine, beer, mead and kumis.
- Arnemetia - Celtic river goddess (Her name is connected with nemeton, “sacred grove,” which means it’s the best place to find brewing water).
- Ash - Egyptian god of wine and oases.
- Bacchus - Roman god of wine, usually identified with the Greek Dionysus.
- Ba-Maguje - Hausa spirit of drunkenness.
- Bes - Egyptian god, protector of the home, and patron of beer brewers.
- Biersal/Bierasal/Bieresal - Germanic kobold of the beer cellar.
- Bhairava/Bharani - Indian/Hindu god of soma (also associated with sacred beer).
- Brigid of Kildare/Saint Brigid - patron saint of brewing.
- Byggvir - Norse god of barley (and, thus, beer).
- Ceraon - who watched over the mixing of wine with water.
- Dea Latis - Celtic goddess of beer.
- Dionysus - Greek god of wine, usually identified with the Roman Bacchus.
- Du Kang - Chinese sage of wine. Inventor of wine and patron to the alcohol industry.
- Hathor - Egyptian goddess of love, passion, wine, and drunkenness.
- Inari - Shinto goddess of sake.
- Li Bai - Chinese god of wine and sage of poetry.
- Liber/Liber Pater - a Roman god of wine.
- Liu Ling - Chinese god of wine. One of the Seven Sages of the Bamboo Grove.
- Mayahuel - Mexican goddess of pulque.
- Methe - Greek personification of drinking and drunkenness.
- Nephthys - Egyptian goddess of beer.
- Ninkasi - Mesopotamian goddess of beer.
- Nokhubulwane - Zulu goddess of the rainbow, agriculture, rain, and beer.
- Oenotropae - Greek goddesses, "the women who change (anything into) wine".
- Ogoun - Yoruba/West African/Voodoo god of rum.
- Ometochtli - Aztec gods of excess.
- Osiris - Egyptian god of beer and wine.
- Radegast - Slavic god of drinking and hospitality.
- Raugutiene and Raugupatis - Baltic god and goddess of fermentation and beer.
- Silenus - Greek god of wine, wine pressing, and drunkenness.
- Siris - Mesopotamian goddess of beer.
- Soma - Hindu god of alcoholic beverages.
- Sucellus - Celtic god of agriculture, forests, and of the alcoholic drinks of the Gauls.
- Tao Yuanming - Chinese spirit of wine.
- Tenemit - Egyptian goddess of beer.
- Tenenet - Egyptian goddess of childbirth and beer.
- Tezcatzontecati- Aztec god of pulque, of drunkenness and fertility (one of the Ometochtli).
- Varuni - Hindu goddess of wine.
- Yasigi - African goddess of beer (depicted as the ultimate party girl).
- Yi-ti - Chinese god (said to have created the first rice and grape wines).

== See also ==
- Beer goddess
- Religion and alcohol
