= Latos =

Latos may refer to:

- Latis, Celtic polytheism
- Mat Latos (born 1987), American professional baseball pitcher
- James Latos (born 1966), Canadian professional ice hockey coach and player
- Tomasz Latos (born 1964), Polish politician
