= Ghillar Michael Anderson =

Australian Aboriginal elder

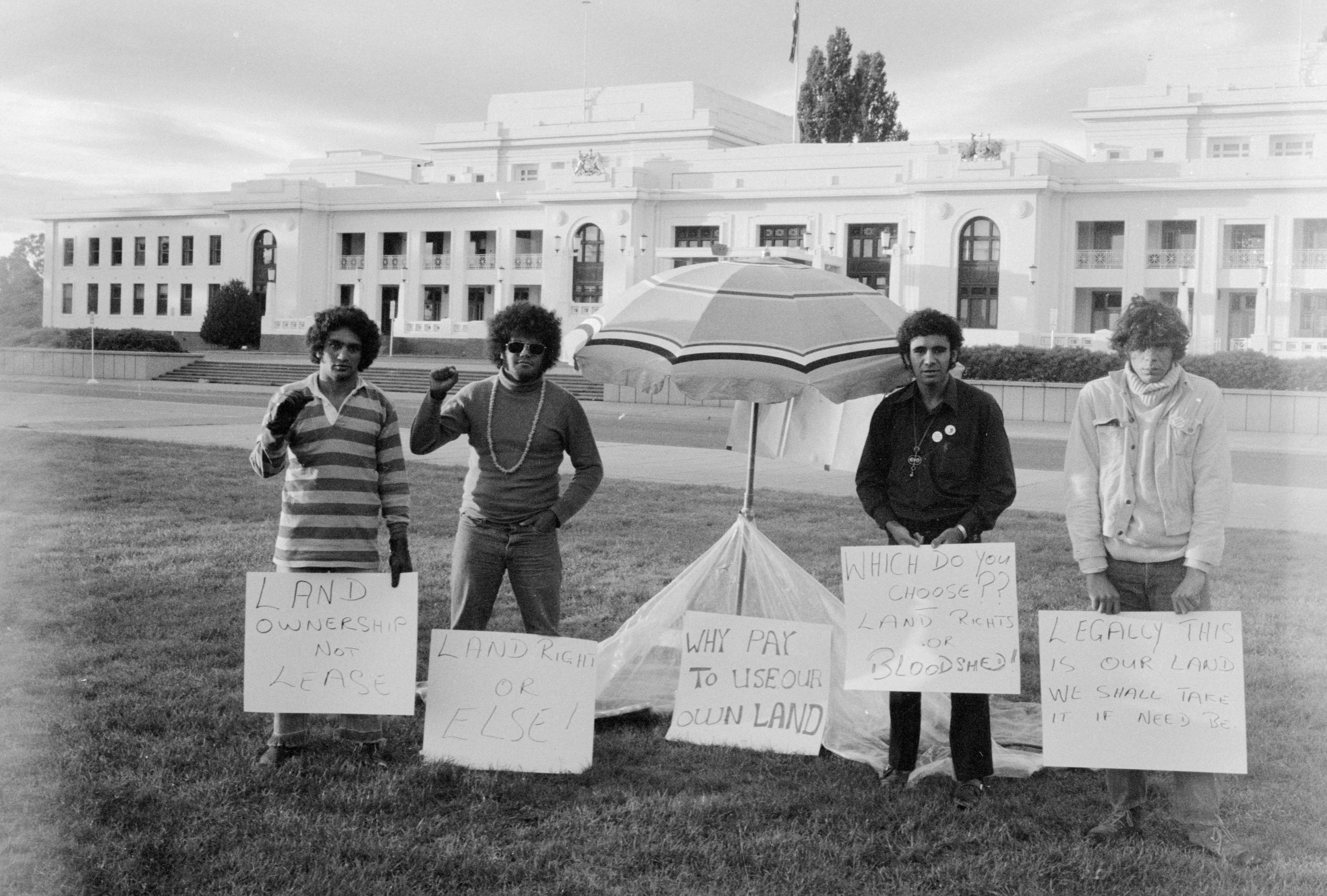
First day of the Aboriginal Tent Embassy outside Parliament House in Canberra on 17 January 1972. Left to right: Billy Craigie, Bert Williams, Ghillar Michael Anderson and Tony Coorey.

Ghillar Michael Anderson (born 1951), or Michael Ghillar Anderson, is a Euahlayi Elder and activist from Goodooga, New South Wales, in Australia.

In 1972 he was one of the four men who set up the Aboriginal Tent Embassy in Canberra, as a protest in the struggle for the recognition of Indigenous land rights in Australia, eventually becoming its High Commissioner.

As a participant in the Australian Aboriginal Astronomy Project, Anderson has collaborated with academic astronomers Robert Fuller and Duane Hamacher in sharing and documenting traditional star knowledge. He has been pivotal in researching the Emu in the sky astronomical interpretation, that recognises the space between the stars in the Milky Way as containing ancestral figures, the inspiration for the title of Bruce Pascoe's Dark Emu.

Anderson was featured in a documentary film about Aboriginal Australian astronomy, which was widely shown, including in schools.

Anderson has sat on a UN Committee in Geneva addressing the repatriation of cultural material.

In 2013, Anderson with other leaders, proclaimed a republic in Dirranbandi, Queensland. He was elected his nation's head of state and informed Queen Elizabeth II.

== Awards and honours ==
In June 2021 Asteroid 10040 Ghillar was named in honour of Anderson by the IAU. The asteroid was discovered by Czech astronomer Zdeňka Vávrová at the Kleť Observatory in 1984. The citation reads as follows:

Ghillar Michael Anderson (b. 1951), of Goodooga, NSW (Australia), is an Aboriginal elder, Senior Law Man, and leader of the Euahlayi people bordering northern New South Wales and southern Queensland. He has shared in-depth knowledge about Kamilaroi and Euahlayi astronomical knowledge and has published several academic papers on the topic.
