= Lists of deities by cultural sphere =

Lists of deities

This is an index to deities of the different religions, cultures and mythologies of the world, listed by region or culture.

== Africa ==
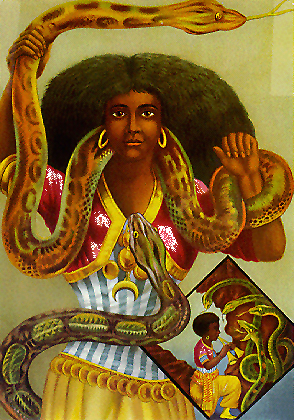
Poster of a Mami Wata, "serpent priestess" painted ca. 1926 by German (Hamburg) artist Schleisinger, displayed in shrines as a popular image of Mami Wata in Africa and in the Diaspora.

North Africa

- Berber deities
  - Guanche deities
- Egyptian deities

Osiris, lord of the dead. His green skin symbolizes rebirth

Sub-Saharan Africa

- African deities
  - Alusi
  - Oriṣa

== Americas ==
- Native American deities

Central America

- Aztec deities
- Maya deities

North America

- Afro-American deities
  - Loa
  - Orisha
- Inuit deities
- Mormon deity

South America

- Incan deities
- Guarani deities
- Mapuche deities
- Muisca deities

== Eurasia ==
Caucasus

- Armenian deities
- Georgian deities
- Vainakh deities

Central Asia

- Turkic deities

East Asia

- Chinese deities
  - Taoist pure ones
- Japanese deities
- Korean deities

Europe

- Albanian deities
- Baltic deities
  - Latvian deities
  - Lithuanian deities
- Basque deities
- Celtic deities
  - Irish deities
- Etruscan deities
- Finnic deities
- Germanic deities
  - Anglo-Saxon deities
  - Norse deities
- Greek deities
  - Mycenaean deities
- Hungarian deities
- Lusitani deities
- Paleo-Balkan deities (Dacian/Illyrian/Thracian)
- Roman deities
- Sami deities
- Slavic deities
- Thelemic deities
- Wiccan deities

Middle East

- Abrahamic deity
  - God in the Baháʼí Faith
  - God in Christianity (see also Trinity and Jesus in Christianity)
  - God in Druzism
  - God in Islam
  - God in Judaism
  - God in Mandaeism
- Iranian deities
  - Yazata (see also Proto-Indo-Iranian religion)
  - Elam
  - Manichaean deity
  - Zoroastrian deity (see also Zurvan)
- Mesopotamian deities
  - Assyro-Babylonian pantheon (see also Family tree of the Babylonian gods)
  - Kassite deities
  - Sumerian deities
- Ugaritic deities
- Semitic deities
  - Canaanite deities
  - Pre-Islamic Arabian deities
    - Jinn
    - Nabataean deities

North Asia

- Siberian deities

South Asia

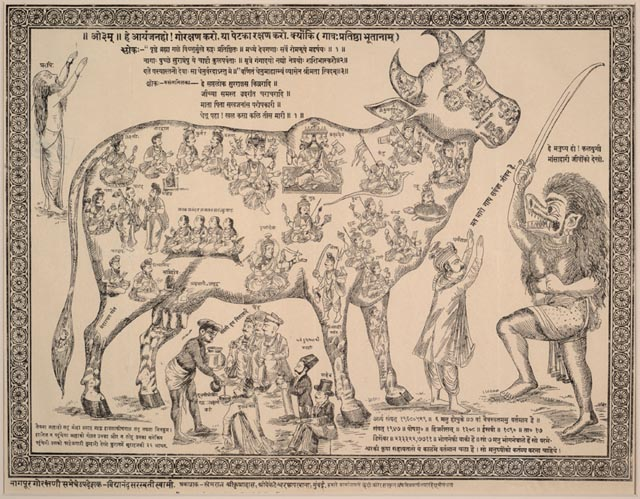
The image illustrates the Hindu belief that each part of the cow embodies a particular deity

- Buddhas
- Buddhist Bodhisattvas
- Buddhist deities
- Hindu deities
  - Rigvedic deities (see also Proto-Indo-Iranian religion)
  - Sri Lankan Tamil local deities
  - Tamil Nadu local deities
- Tirthankara

Southeast Asia

- Indonesian deities
- Manipuri deities
  - Ancestral deities of Manipur
  - King of Gods in Manipuri mythology
  - King of Serpent deities in Manipuri mythology
- Philippine deities

West Asia

- Anatolia
  - Hittite deities
  - Hurrian deities
  - Lydian deities

== Oceania ==
- Australian Aboriginal deities
- Polynesian deities
  - Hawaiian deities
  - Māori deities of New Zealand
  - Rapa Nui deities of Easter Island
