= Ilargi =

Daughter of Mother Earth in Basque mythology

Ilargi, Ile or Ilazki (Basque language: "Moon") is the Goddess of the Moon in Basque mythology.

She is the sister of Eki, the Goddess of the Sun, and the daughter of the Goddess Amalur, Mother Earth, to whom, as her sister, she returns daily.

== See also ==
- List of lunar deities
