= Beer goddess =

Beer goddess may refer to:

- Dea Latis, Celtic goddess of beer.
- Nephthys, Egyptian goddess of beer.
- Ninkasi, Sumerian goddess of beer.
- Siduri, wise female divinity of beer in the Epic of Gilgamesh.
- Siris (goddess), Mesopotamian goddess of beer.
- Tenenet, Egyptian goddess of childbirth and beer.

== See also ==
- List of deities of wine and beer
