= List of solar deities =

A solar deity is a god or goddess who represents the Sun, or an aspect of it, usually by its perceived power and strength. Solar deities and Sun worship can be found throughout most of recorded history in various forms. The following is a list of solar deities:

== African ==
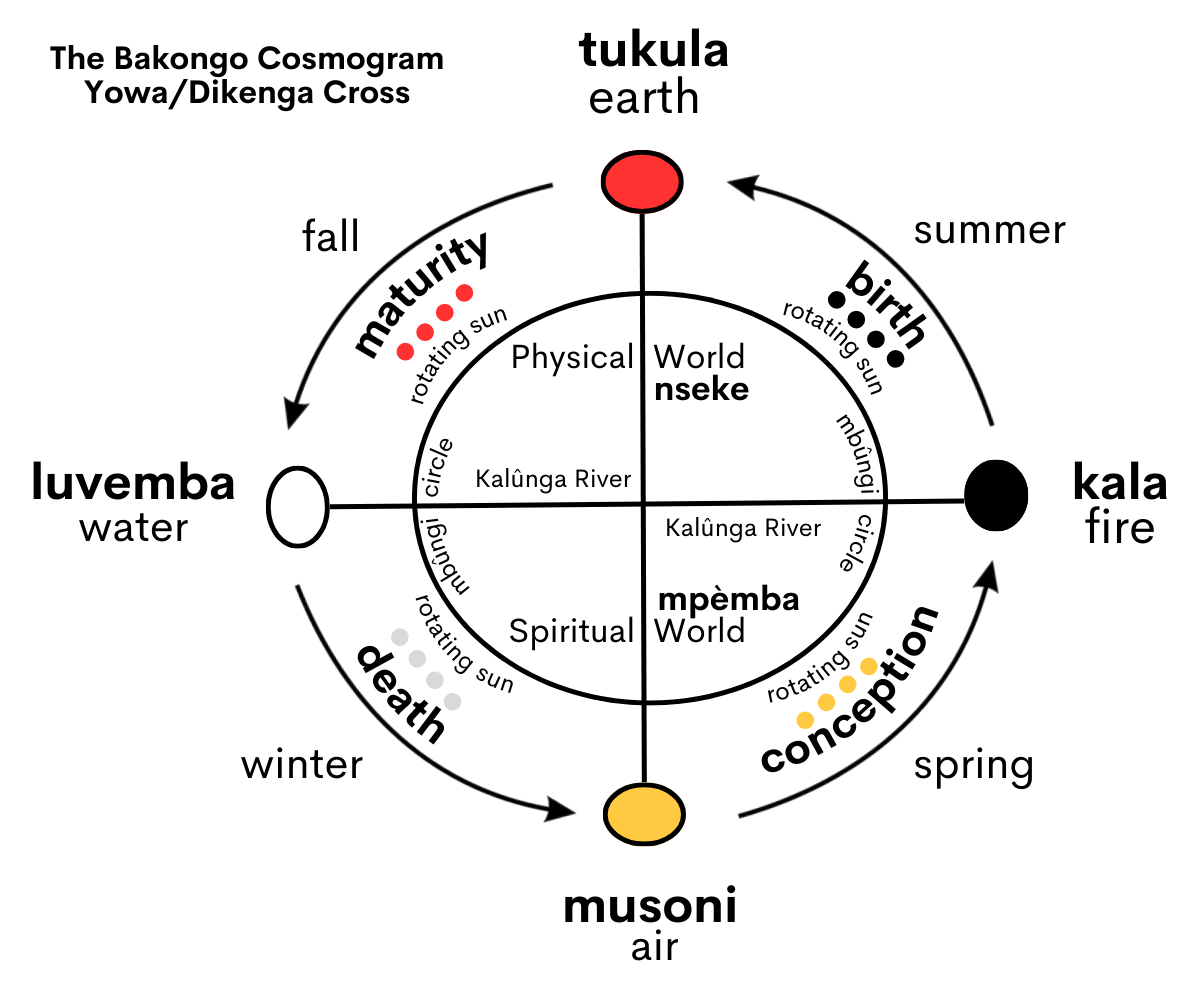
The Bakongo Cosmogram, depicting Nzambi's four moments of the sun

=== Bakongo mythology ===
- Nzambi Mpungu, Kongo god of the Sun and creation

=== Bantu mythology ===
- Nyambe, the Bantu god of the Sun and creation

=== Berber/Amazigh mythology ===
- Magec, Tenerife goddess of the Sun and light

=== Igbo mythology ===
- Anyanwu, Igbo god believed to dwell in the Sun

=== Dahomey mythology ===
- Mawu, Dahomey goddess associated with the Sun and the Moon

=== Egyptian mythology ===
- Amun, creator deity sometimes identified as a Sun god
- Aten, god of the Sun, the visible disc of the Sun
- Atum, the "finisher of the world" who represents the Sun as it sets
- Bast, cat goddess associated with the Sun
- Hathor, mother or wife of Horus and Ra and goddess of the Sun
- Horus, god of the sky whose right eye was considered to be the Sun and his left the Moon
- Khepri, god of the rising Sun, creation and renewal of life
- Ptah, god of craftsmanship, the arts, and fertility, sometimes said to represent the Sun at night
- Ra, god of the Sun
- Sekhmet, goddess of war and of the Sun, sometimes also plagues and creator of the desert
- Sopdu, god of war and the scorching heat of the summer Sun
- Khnum, the ram god often depicted as Ra's form in the evening entering the river of night and called the divine Potter for creating humans

=== Guanche mythology ===
- Magec, was god or goddess (actual gender is unknown) of the Sun

=== Nubian mythology ===
- Apedemak, the Meroitic god of war and sometimes depicted as the god the Sun

=== Zulu mythology ===
- uMvelinqangi, Xhosa and Zulu people's god of the Sun and sky
- iNyanga, Zulu people, goddess of the Moon
- Ukhulukhulwana, Zulu people's ancestor who came from the stars. He taught them to build huts and taught them the high laws of isiNtu

== American ==
=== Abenaki Mythology ===
- Kisosen, the Abenaki solar deity, an eagle whose wings opened to create the day and closed to cause the nighttime

=== Aztec mythology ===
- Huitzilopochtli, god of the Sun and war
- Nanahuatzin, god of the Sun
- Teoyaomicqui, god of lost souls, the Sun, and the sixth hour of the day
- Tonatiuh, god of the Sun and ruler of the heavens

=== Blackfoot mythology ===
- Napioa, the Blackfoot deity of the Sun.

=== Brazilian mythology ===
- Guaraci, god of the Sun (Guarani mythology)
- Jurupari, solar hero or god (Tupian mythology)
- Meri, folk hero and god of the Sun.

=== Cherokee mythology ===
- Unelanuhi, Cherokee sun goddess.

=== Chickasaw mythology ===
- Aba' Bínni'li', the Chickasaw creator deity, strongly associated with the sun.

=== Inca mythology ===
- Apu Inti, also known as Apu Punchaw, god of the Sun and patron deity of the Inca Empire
- Ch'aska ("Venus") or Ch'aska Quyllur ("Morning star") was the goddess of dawn, twilight, youth, and, the planet itself.

=== Ho-Chunk mythology ===
- Herešgúnina, god of evil who was decapitated and made into the sun.

=== Hopi mythology ===
- Tawa, the Hopi creator and god of the Sun.

=== Inuit mythology ===
- Akycha, Sun goddess worshiped in Alaska
- Siqiniq, goddess of the Sun found across Greenland, northern Canada, and Alaska.

=== Kathlamet mythology ===
- Aqalax, Kathlamet sun woman.

=== Lakota mythology ===
- Wi, Lakota god of the Sun.

=== Mapuche mythology ===
- Antü, Sun deity or pillán of the mapuche from Chile and Argentina

=== Maya mythology ===
- Ah Kin, god of the Sun, bringer of doubt, and protector against the evils associated with darkness
- Hunahpu, one of the Maya Hero Twins; he transformed into the Sun while his brother transformed into the Moon
- Kinich Ahau, god of the Sun

=== Muisca mythology ===
- Sué, god of the Sun and husband of Chía, the Moon

=== Navajo mythology ===
- Jóhonaaʼéí, the Navajo Sun god, known as "The One Who Rules the Day"

== Asian ==
=== Ainu mythology ===
- Chup Kamui, a lunar goddess who switched places with her brother to become goddess of the Sun

=== Arabian mythology ===
- Malakbel, god of the Sun
- Shams/Shamsun, a solar goddess exalted in Himyar and by the Sabaeans.

=== Armenian mythology ===
- Ar/Arev, the Sun god with its people as "children of the Sun"

=== Buddhist mythology ===
- Marici, goddess of the heavens, the Sun, and light
- Surya, god of the Sun (Suriya Pariththa, Suthra Pitaka, Pali canon, Theravada Buddhism)

=== Canaanite mythology ===
- Shapash, goddess of the Sun
- Ba'al, god of life and fertility, also associated with the Sun and storms

=== Chinese mythology ===
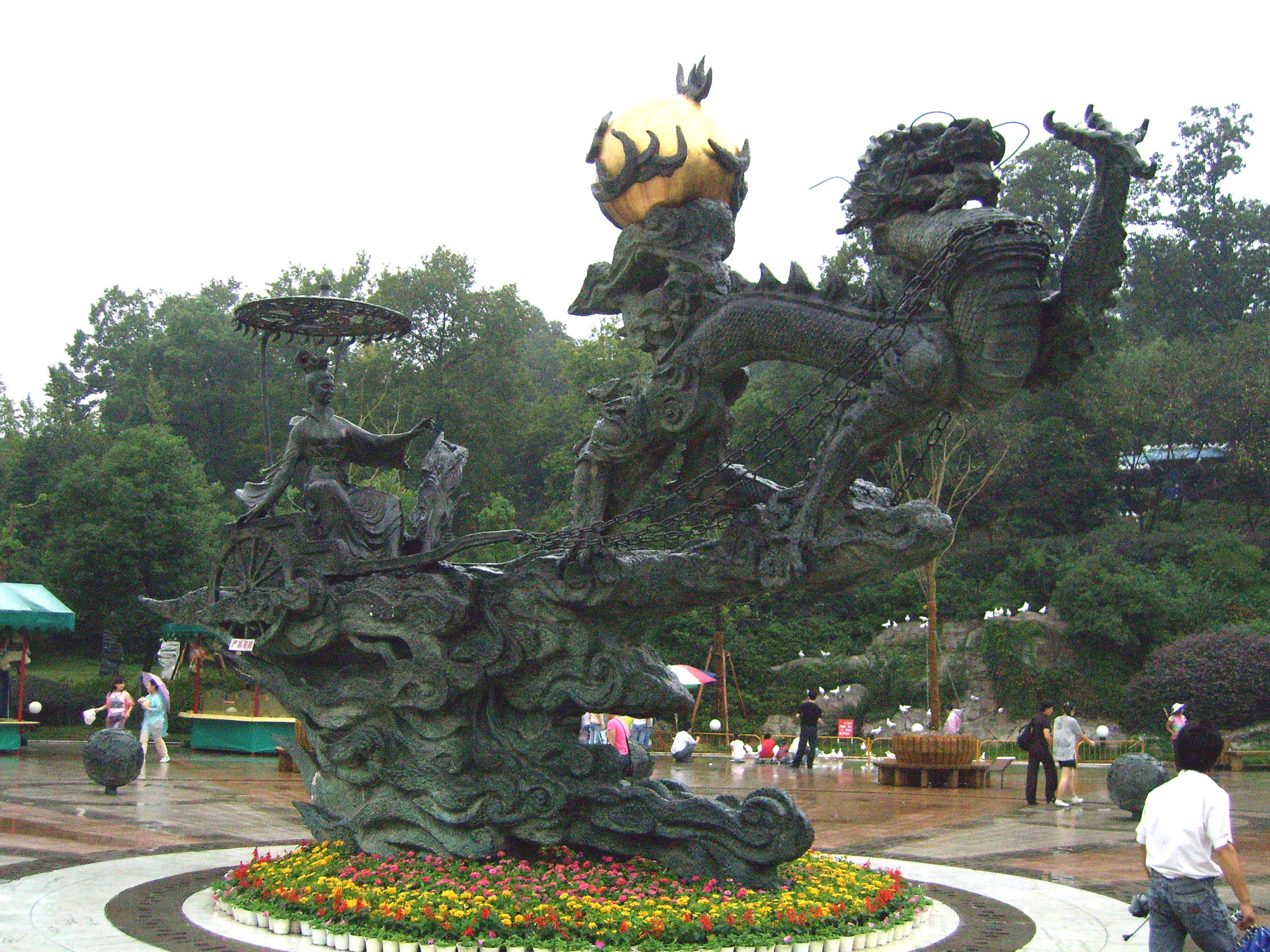
Statue of the goddess Xihe charioteering the Sun, being pulled by a dragon, in Hangzhou

- Doumu, Sun goddess sometimes conflated with Marici.
- Xihe, Sun goddess and mother of the ten suns
- Hou Yi, Archer God that shot down 9 Suns but left 1 sun up, to maintain balance.
- Xu Kai, god of the Sun star
- Zhulong, red solar dragon god in chinese mythology

=== Elamite ===
- Nahundi, god of the Sun and law

=== Filipino mythology ===
- Init-init: the Itneg god of the Sun married to the mortal Aponibolinayen; during the day, he leaves his house to shine light on the world
- Chal-chal: the Bontok god of the Sun whose son's head was cut off by Kabigat; aided the god Lumawig in finding a spouse
- Mapatar: the Ifugao sun deity of the sky in charge of daylight
- Sun God: the Ibaloi deity who pushed up the skyworld and pushed down the underworld, creating earth, after he was hit by a man's arrow during the war between the peoples of the skyworld and the underworld
- Elag: the Bugkalot deity of the Sun, worshiped with the moon and stars; has a magnificent house in the sky realm called Gacay; retreats to his home during nights; giver of light and growth
- Apo Init: the Ilocano deity of the sun
- Amman: the Ilocano god of the Sun, where the sun is his eye
- Agueo: the morose and taciturn Pangasinense sun god who is obedient to his father, Ama; lives in a palace of light
- Algao: the Aeta Sun god who battled the giant turtle Bacobaco
- Mangetchay: also called Mangatia; the Kapampangan supreme deity who created life on earth in remembrance of his dead daughter; lives in the Sun; in other versions, she is the creator and net-weaver of the heavens
- Aring Sinukûan: the Kapampangan Sun god of war and death, taught the early inhabitants the industry of metallurgy, wood cutting, rice culture and even waging war; lives in Mount Arayat, and later included a female form
- Apolaki: the Tagalog god of sun and warriors; son of Anagolay and Dumakulem; sometimes referred as son of Bathala and brother of Mayari; ruler of the world during daytime
- Quadruple Deities: the four childless naked Tau-buid Mangyan deities, composed of two gods who come from the Sun and two goddesses who come from the upper part of the river; summoned using the paragayan or diolang plates
- Adlao: the Bicolano son of Dagat and Paros; joined Daga's rebellion and died; his body became the sun; in another myth, he was alive and during a battle, he cut one of Bulan's arm and hit Bulan's eyes, where the arm was flattened and became the earth, while Bulan's tears became the rivers and seas
- Unnamed God: a Bicolano Sun god who fell in love with the mortal, Rosa; refused to light the world until his father consented to their marriage; he afterwards visited Rosa, but forgetting to remove his powers over fire, he accidentally burned Rosa's whole village until nothing but hot springs remained
- Sanghid: the Waray giant who wove cloth on a gold loom with supernatural speed; has the power to move back the Sun
- Liadlao: the gold-bodied Bisaya son of Lidagat and Lihangin; killed by Kaptan's rage during the great revolt; his body became the Sun
- Adlaw: the Bisaya Sun deity worshiped by the good
- Launsina: the Capiznon goddess of the Sun, Moon, stars, and seas, and the most beloved because people seek forgiveness from her
- Magrakad: the Tagbanwa god found at exactly noontime on the other side of the Sun; gives the warmth which sustains life and, when the people are ill, carries away sickness
- Tumangkuyun: wash and keep clean the trunks of the two sacred cardinal trees in Sidpan and Babatan by using the blood of those who have died in epidemics; the blood he uses causes the colors of the sunrise and sunset
- Libtakan: the Manobo god of sunrise, sunset, and good weather
- Unnamed Gods: the Bagobo gods whose fire create smoke that becomes the white clouds, while the Sun creates yellow clouds that make the colors of the rainbow
- Kadaw La Sambad: one of the two T'boli supreme deities; married to Bulon La Mogoaw; lives in the seventh layer of the universe
- Lageay Lengkuos: the greatest of Teduray heroes and a shaman (beliyan) who made the earth and forests; the only one who could pass the magnet stone in the straight between the big and little oceans; inverted the directions where east became west, inverted the path of the Sun, and made the water into land and land into water
- Sun Deity: the divine Maranao being depicted in an anthropomorphic form as a flaming young man; angels serve as his charioteers

=== Hindu mythology ===
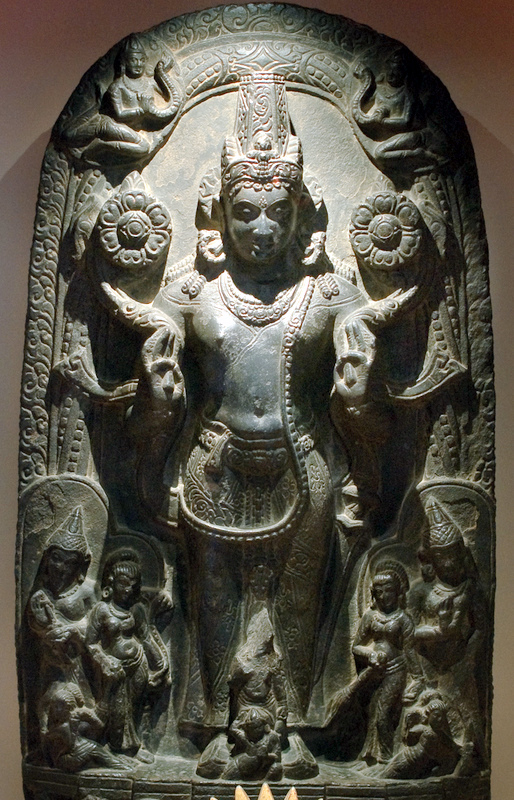
Surya

- Surya, the Sun god, rides across the sky in a horse-drawn chariot.
- Aruna, charioteer of Surya, god of the morning Sun.
- Aryaman, god of the midday Sun.
- Savitr, god of the twilight Sun, also known as sunrise and sunset.
- Mitra, often associated with the Sun
- Samjna, wife of Surya, mother of Yama, Ashvins and Revanta
- Chhaya, wife of Surya, mother of Shani
- Tapati, daughter of Surya and Chhaya, personification of the river Tapti.
- Yamuna, daughter of Surya and Samjna, personification of the river Yamuna.
- Ushas, goddess of dawn.
- Gayatri, goddess of the Gayatri mantra, strongly associated with Surya and central to the ritual of Sandhyavandana.
- Aditi, mother of Surya, has strong solar connotations in early Vedic texts
- Adityas, forms of Surya across the 12 months of the Hindu calendar.
- Khandoba, a syncretistic form of Surya and Shiva venerated as a folk-god by Marathi Hindus.

=== Hittite mythology ===
- Istanu, goddess/god of the Sun and judgment
- Sun goddess of Arinna
- Sun god of Heaven, daylight god of judgement
- Sun goddess of the Earth, infernal goddess of the underworld.

=== Japanese mythology ===
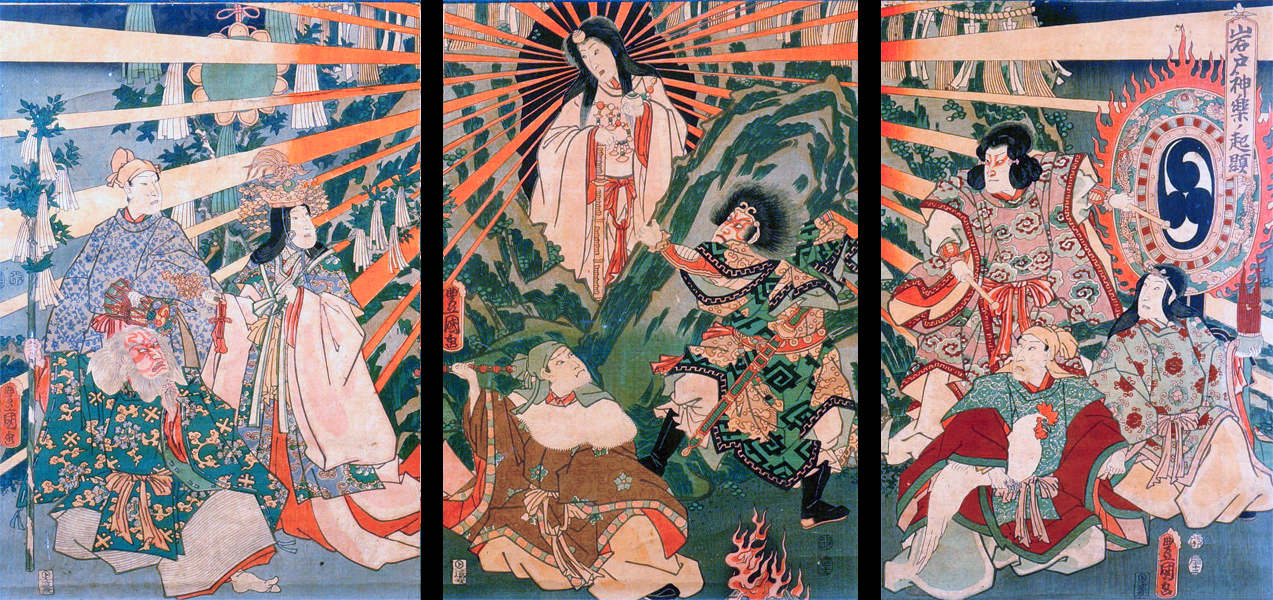
Amaterasu emerging out of a cave, bringing sunlight back to the universe.

- Amaterasu, goddess of the Sun
- Kamotaketsunumi no Mikoto, god of Sun

=== Korean mythology ===
- Hae Mo-su of Buyeo, god of the Sun

=== Mesopotamian mythology ===
- Shamash, Akkadian god of the Sun and justice
- Utu, Sumerian god of the Sun and justice
- Šerida, Sumerian goddess of light, married to the god of the Sun (Akkadian name Aya)

=== Scythian religion ===
- Tabiti, ancient Iranian goddess possibly connected with the Sun.

=== Tocharian ===
- A "sun deity" (kaum näkte), possibly a goddess.

=== Turkic mythology ===
- Gun Ana, common Turkic solar deity, seen as a goddess in the Kazakh and Kyrgyz traditions
- Koyash, god of the Sun

=== Persian mythology ===
- Mithra, often associated with the Sun.
- Hvare-khshaeta, the Sun yazata

=== Zunism ===
- The Zunbil dynasty and the subjects of Zabulistan worshiped the Sun, which they called Zun. They believed that the Sun was the god of justice, the force of good in the world and, consequently, the being that drove out the darkness and allowed man to live another day.

=== Vietnamese mythology ===
- Goddess Thần Mặt Trời, the embodiment of the sun, the daughter of Ông Trời, old sister of Thần Mặt Trăng, she and her sister have a husband who is a bear, when the Bear God wants to meet them, a solar or lunar eclipse will appear.

== European ==
=== Albanian mythology ===
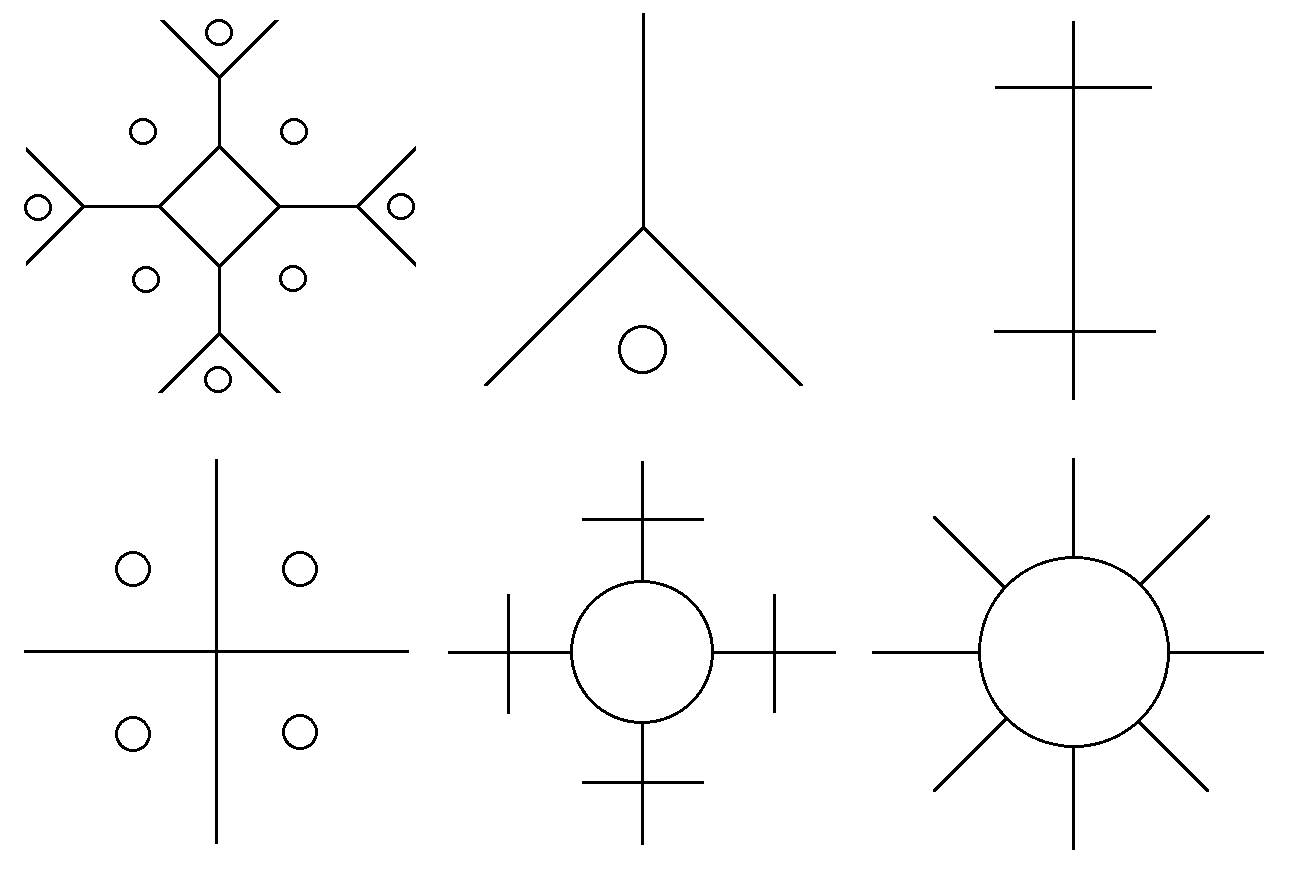
Sun (Dielli) and Fire (Zjarri) symbols in Albanian traditional tattoo patterns (19th century).

- Dielli, the Sun, god of light, sky and weather, giver of life, health and energy, and all-seeing eye.

=== Armenian mythology ===
- Arev
- Areg
- Arpʻi

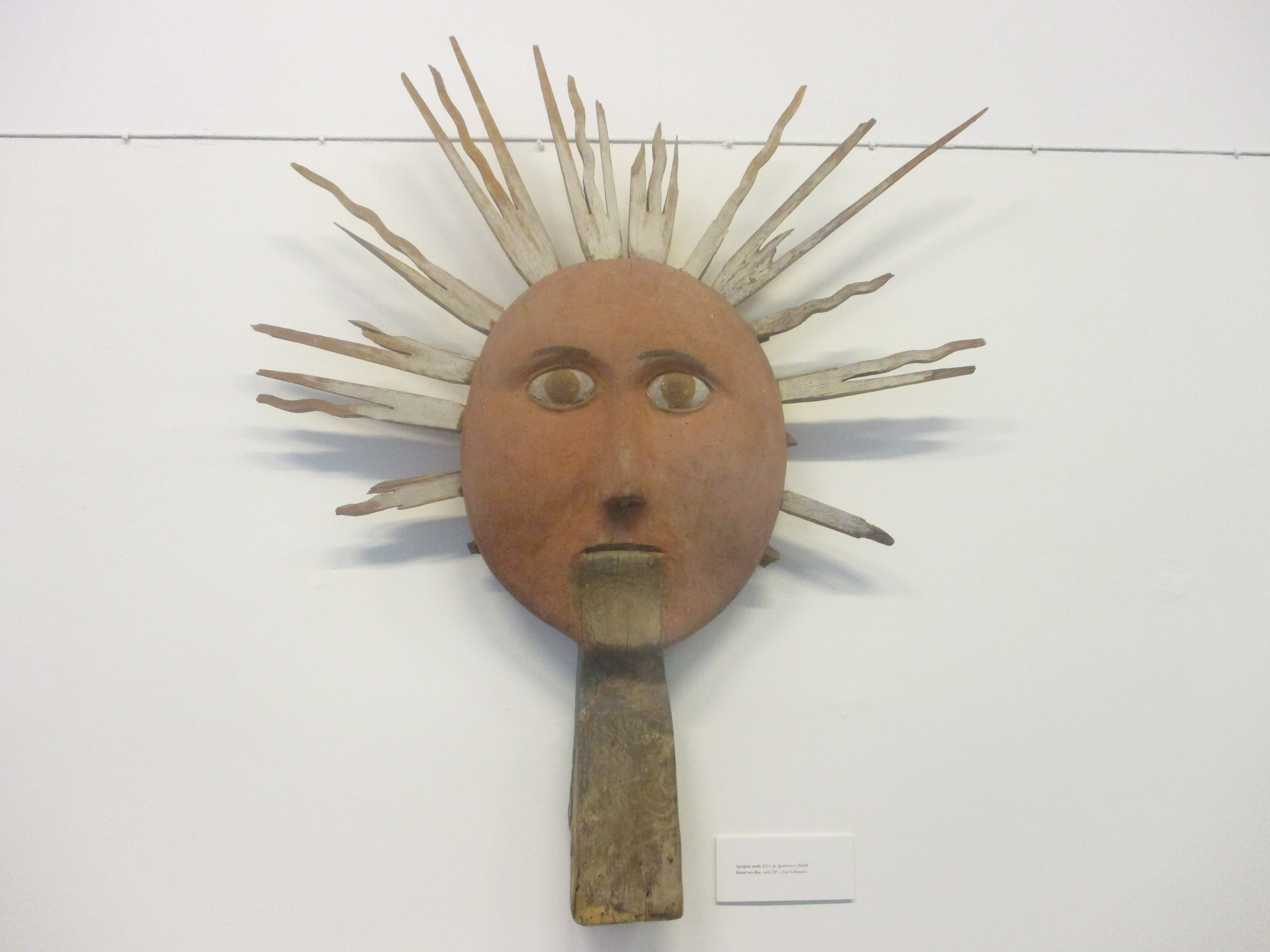
Idol of the Saulė used for peasant rituals in early 20th century from Palūšė, Ignalina District

=== Baltic mythology ===
- Saulė, goddess of the Sun

=== Basque mythology ===
- Ekhi, goddess of the Sun and protector of humanity

=== Celtic mythology ===
- Áine, Irish goddess of love, summer, wealth, and sovereignty, associated with the Sun and midsummer
- Alaunus, Gaulish god of the Sun, healing, and prophecy
- Belenos, Gaulish god of the Sun
- Brighid, Irish sun goddess
- Étaín, Irish Sun goddess
- Grannus, god associated with spas, healing thermal and mineral springs, and the Sun
- Lugh, Sun god as well as a writing and warrior god
- Macha, "Sun of the womanfolk" and occasionally considered synonymous with Grian
- Olwen, female figure often constructed as originally the Welsh Sun goddess
- Sulis, British goddess whose name is related to the common Proto-Indo-European word for "Sun" and thus cognate with Helios, Sól, Sol, and Surya and who retains solar imagery, as well as a domain over healing and thermal springs. Probably the de facto solar deity of the Celts.

=== Etruscan mythology ===
- Usil, Etruscan equivalent of Helios

=== Finnish mythology ===
- Päivätär, goddess of the Sun

=== Germanic mythology ===
- Sól/Sunna/Sunne, the common Sun goddess among the Germanic peoples, who according to Nordic mythology is chased across the sky in her horse-drawn chariot by a wolf

=== Greek mythology ===
- Helios, god and personification of the Sun who drives across the sky in a chariot
- Apollo, god of the Sun and light, among others. His most common epithet is Phoebus (“Radiant”)
- Eos, goddess and personification of the dawn
- Hemera, goddess of the day
- Electryone, goddess of the sunrise

=== Hungarian mythology ===
- Nap Király, the Hungarian god of sun who rides his silver fur horse everyday from east to west.
- Nap Anya, Goddess of the sun and partner of Nap király

=== Lusitanian mythology ===
- Endovelicus, god of health and safety, worshipped both as a solar deity and a chthonic one
- Neto, potentially both a solar and war deity
- A possible sun goddess, whose cult was believed to have become that of Virgin Mary Nossa Senhora de Antime.

=== Minoan mythology ===
- Possibly the Snake Goddess.

=== Proto-Indo-European mythology ===
- Sehul
- eye of Dyēws

=== Roman mythology ===
- Aurora, goddess of dawn
- Sol, god of the Sun, rides in a horse-drawn chariot

=== Sami mythology ===
- Beiwe, goddess of the Sun, spring, fertility, and sanity

=== Slavic mythology ===
- Dažbog, god of the Sun
- Hors, god of the Sun

== Oceania ==
=== Australian Aboriginal mythology ===
- Bila, cannibal sun goddess of the Adnyamathanha
- Gnowee, solar goddess who searches daily for her lost son; the light of her torch is the Sun
- Wala, solar goddess
- Wuriupranili, solar goddess whose torch is the Sun
- Yhi, Karraur goddess of the sun, light and creation

=== Māori mythology ===
- Tama-nui-te-rā, personification of the Sun

== See also ==
- List of lunar deities
- Dawn goddess
