= Deipneus =

Demigod of the preparation of meals

Deipneus (Ancient Greek: Δειπνεύς) in Greek mythology, specifically in Sparta, is a demigod of the preparation of meals, specifically the making of bread. He was revered in Achaea.

Polemos says that in Mounykhia (Munychia) honours are paid to a hero Akratopotes (Drinker of Unmixed Wine), and that among the Spartans statues of heroes named Matton (Kneader) and Keraon (Ceraon) (Mixer) have been set up by certain cooks in the public mess. In Akhaia (Achaea), also, Deipneus, who got his name from deípna (δείπνα) & deípno (δείπνο, lit. "evening meal", "supper", "dinner"), is held in honour.

— Athenaeus, Deipnosophistae 1. 39c - 39d (trans. Gullick) (Greek rhetorician 2nd to 3rd century AD)

== See also ==
- Ceraon, Ancient Greek demigod of wine-mixing
- Matton, Ancient Greek demigod of Dough-kneading
- List of Greek deities
