= Matton (mythology) =

Matton (Ancient Greek: Μάττων) in Greek mythology is a hero of the meal, specifically the kneading of dough.

The 2nd-century author Athenaeus refers to Matton in his Deipnosophistae, saying, "Polemo says that in Munychia a hero is honoured of the name of Acratopotes and that among the Spartans statues of the heroes Matton and Ceraon were erected by some cooks in the hall of the Phiditia."

== See also ==
- Deipneus, Ancient Greek demigod of bread-baking
- Ceraon, Ancient Greek demigod of wine-mixing
- List of Greek deities
