= Pantheon (religion) =

Collection of gods of a particular religion or mythos

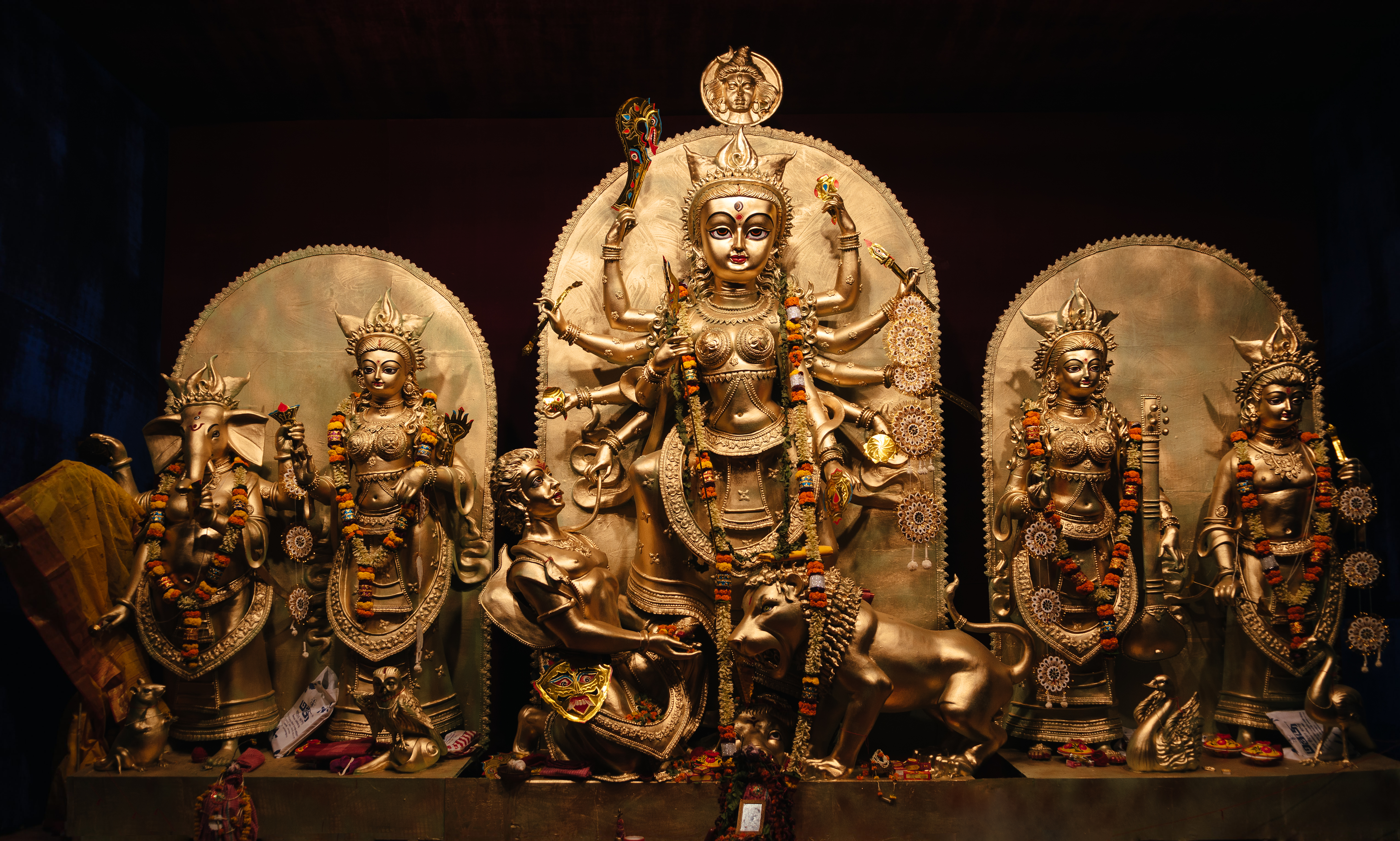
A pantheon of Hindu deities being worshipped during Durga Puja festivities in Kolkata, India

A pantheon is the particular set of all gods of any individual polytheistic religion, mythology, or tradition.

== Etymology ==
The word, pantheon, derives from Greek πάνθεον pantheon, literally "(a temple) of all gods", "of or common to all gods" from πᾶν pan- "all" and θεός theos "god".

== Examples ==
Some well-known historical polytheistic pantheons include the Sumerian gods and the Egyptian gods, and the classical-attested pantheon which includes the ancient Greek religion and Roman religion. Post-classical polytheistic religions include Norse Æsir and Vanir, the Aztec gods, and many others.

== Interpretations ==
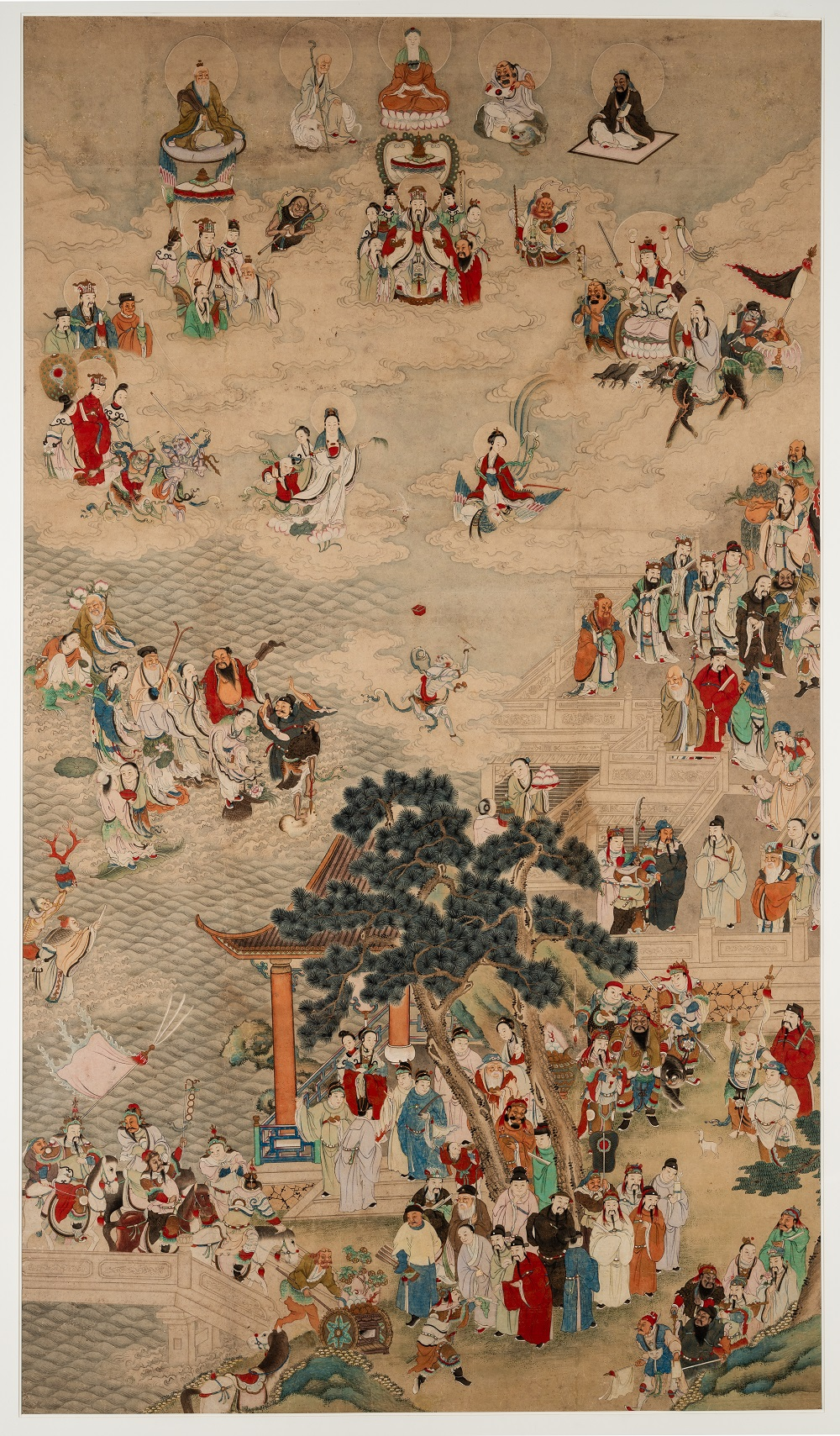
Painting of Chinese Taoist pantheon.

A pantheon of gods is a common element of polytheistic societies. A society's pantheon can be considered an aspiring self-reflection of that society:

A pantheon is an overview of a given culture's gods and goddesses and reflects not only the society's values but also its sense of itself. A pantheon directed by a thunderbolt wielding autocrat might suggest a patriarchy and the valuing of warrior skills. A pantheon headed by a great-mother goddess could suggest a village-based agricultural society. To confront the pantheon of the Egyptians is to confront a worldview marked by a sense of death and resurrection and the agricultural importance of the cycles of nature. The Greek pantheon is a metaphor for a pragmatic view of life that values art, beauty, and the power of the individual, and that is somewhat skeptical about human nature.

In the modern vernacular, most historical polytheistic religions are referred to as "mythology".

== Evolution of pantheons ==
Scholars such as Jaan Puhvel, J. P. Mallory, and Douglas Q. Adams have reconstructed aspects of the ancient Proto-Indo-European religion, from which the religions of the various Indo-European peoples derive, and that this religion was an essentially naturalist numenistic religion. An example of a religious notion from this shared past is the concept of *dyēus, which is attested in several distinct religious systems.

In many civilizations, pantheons tended to grow over time. Deities first worshipped as the patrons of cities or places came to be collected together as empires extended over larger territories. Conquests could lead to the subordination of the elder culture's pantheon to a newer one, as in the Greek Titanomachy, and possibly also the case of the Æsir and Vanir in the Norse mythos. Cultural exchange could lead to "the same" deity being renowned in two places under different names, as seen with the Greeks, Etruscans, and Romans, and also to the cultural transmission of elements of an extraneous religion into a local cult, as with worship of the ancient Egyptian deity Osiris, which was later followed in ancient Greece. Max Weber's 1922 opus Economy and Society discusses a tendency of the ancient Greek philosophers to interpret gods worshiped in the pantheons of other cultures as "equivalent to and so identical with the deities of the moderately organized Greek pantheon".

In other instances, however, national pantheons were consolidated or simplified into fewer gods, or into a single god with power over all of the areas originally assigned to a pantheon. For example, in the ancient Near East during the first millennium BCE, Syrian and Palestinian tribes worshiped much smaller pantheons than had been developed in Egypt and Mesopotamia. Weber also identified the link between a pantheon of gods and the development of monotheism, proposing that the domination of a pantheon by a particular god within that pantheon was a step towards followers of the pantheon seeing that god as "an international or universal deity, a transnational god of the entire world". The first known instance of a pantheon being consolidated into a single god, or discarded in favor of a single god, was with the development of the short-lived practice of Atenism in ancient Egypt, with that role being accorded to the sun god. A similar process is thought to have taken place with respect to the Israelite deity Yahweh, who, "as a typical West Semitic deity... would have four or five compatriot gods in attendance as he became the national high god".

The concept of a pantheon of gods has been widely imitated in Twentieth-century fantasy literature and role-playing games like Dungeons & Dragons. These uses tend to borrow heavily from historical patterns. In these contexts, it is considered important for the writer to construct a pantheon of gods that fits the genre, where the characteristics of the gods are in balance so that none of them is able to overwhelm the story, and so that the actions of the characters are not overwhelmed by the machinations of the gods.

== Extension of the concept into structures and celebrities ==
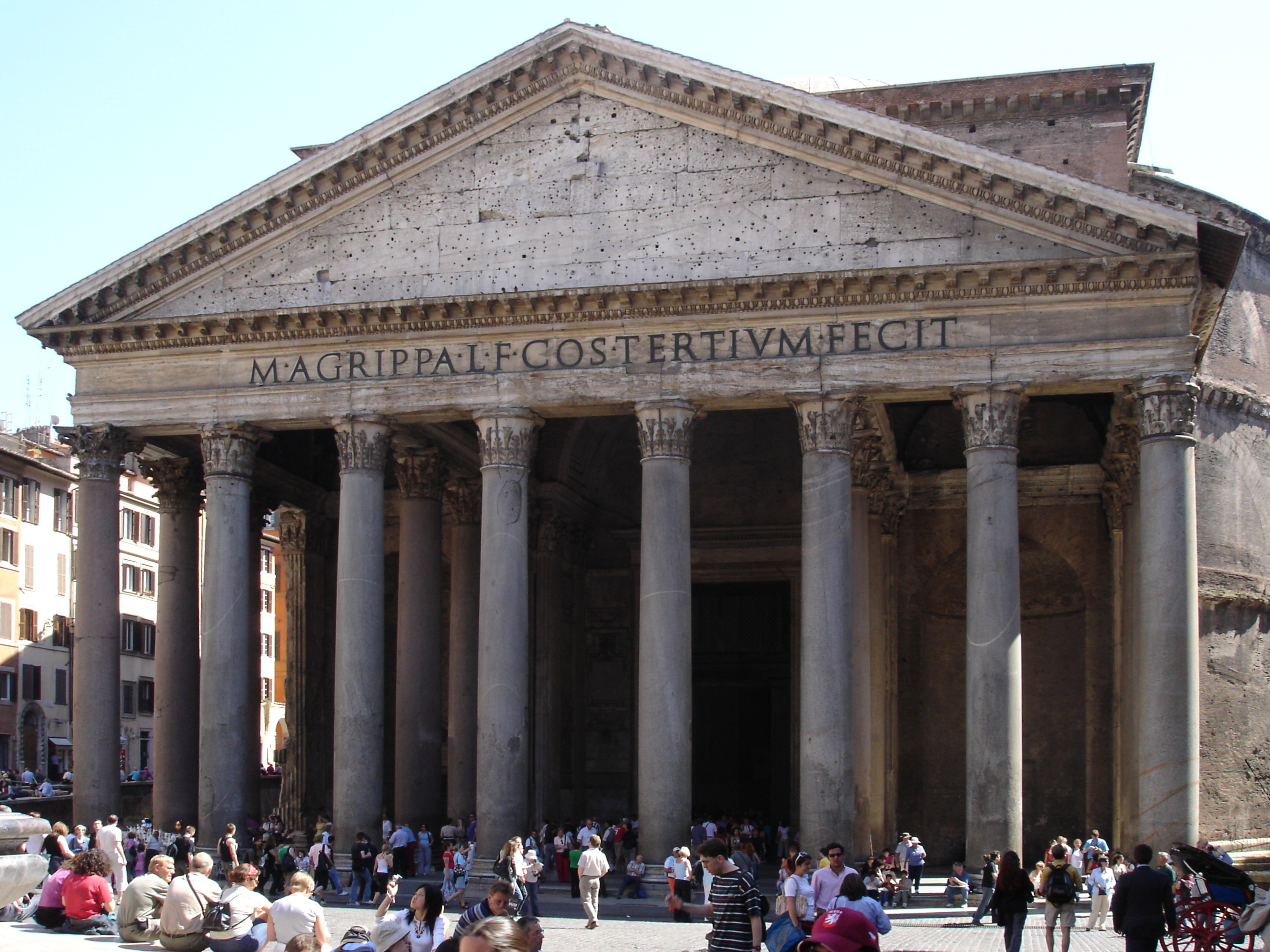
A pantheon in its sense as a "temple", this one built in 2nd-century Rome

In order to avoid the difficulty of giving an exhaustive list of deities when devoting a temple or sacred building, a structure explicitly dedicated to "all deities" also came to be referred to as a "Pantheon". The best known of such structures is the Pantheon of Rome, first built by Marcus Agrippa as part of a complex created by him on his own property in the Campus Martius in 29–19 BCE. The building standing today was constructed on the same site around 126 CE. It was dedicated to "all gods" as a gesture embracing the religious syncretism in the increasingly multicultural Roman Empire, with subjects worshipping gods from many cultures and traditions. The building was later renovated for use as a Christian church in 609 under Pope Boniface IV.

[T]he relation between the building and the primary reference point of the term 'pantheon', the pantheon of the gods, has always been a matter of the greatest uncertainty. By the sixteenth century these two aspects, the building and the grouping of gods, had become merged, to the extent that the building in Rome became the principal model for subsequent 'pantheons'.

Since the 16th century, "pantheon" has also been used in a secular sense to refer to the set of a society's exalted persons—initially including heroic figures, and later extending to celebrities, generally. Lord Byron drew this connection after viewing the busts of famous historical figures in the Roman Pantheon, writing in Childe Harold's Pilgrimage of how he wished to be at the center of an English Pantheon, and thereby associated with divinity. The Pantheon "thus imbues the modern with the aura of the divine", and "models the interplay of ancient and modern forms of fame". This trend continued into modern times, with the word "pantheon" 'of or for the gods' being reflected in the journalistic meme that refers to financial titans as "Masters of the Universe". For example: Francis Ford Coppola has been described as a member of "that revered pantheon of independent movie directors, which broke the standard Hollywood studio mold as the 1960s expired".

== See also ==
- Lists of deities
- List of pantheons
