= Akycha =

Inuit deity

In Inuit mythology, Akycha is a solar goddess worshipped in Alaska.

== See also ==
- List of solar deities
