= Mother Nature =

Personification of Earth's environment

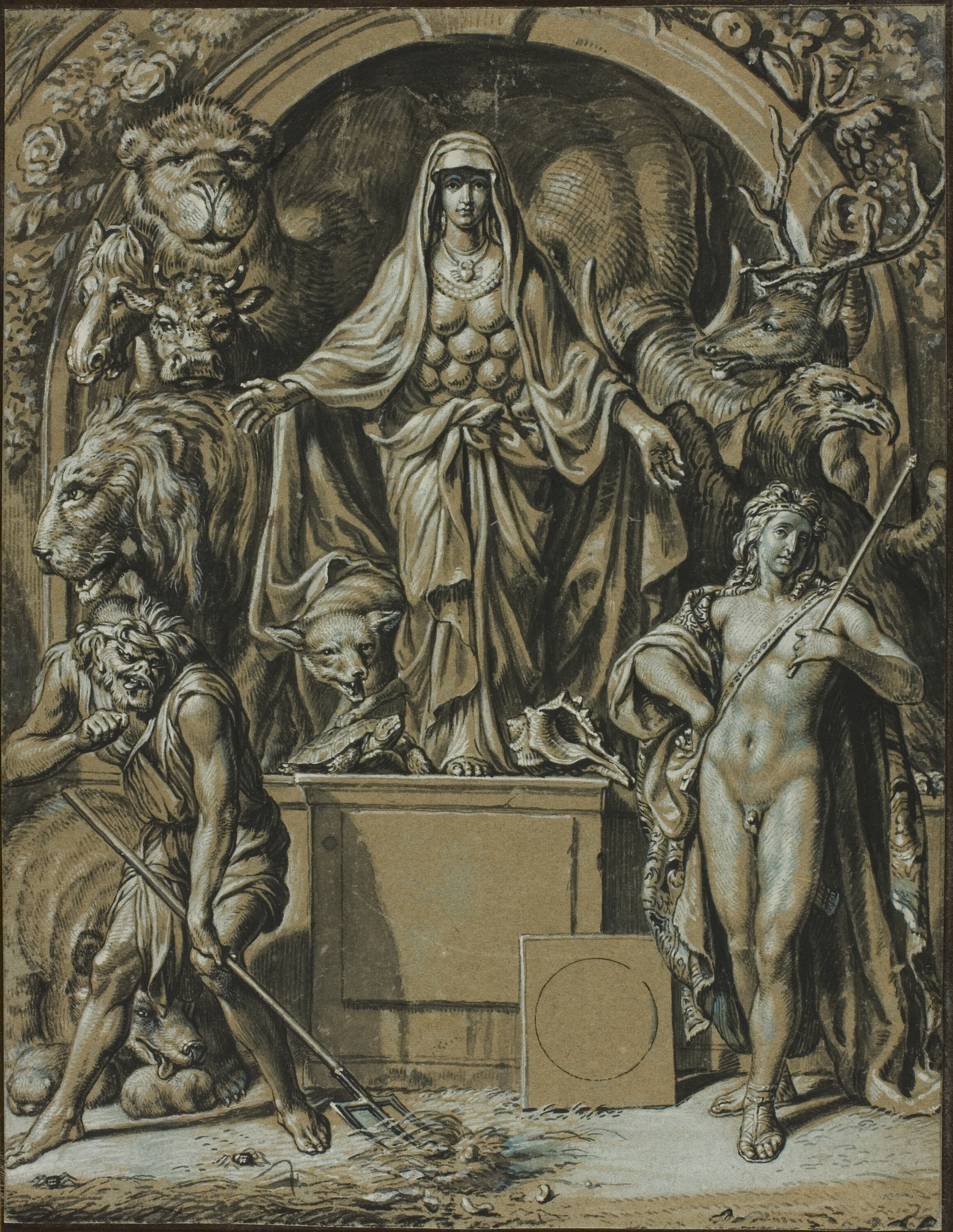
Joseph Werner: Diana of Ephesus as allegory of Nature, c. 1680

Mother Nature (sometimes known as Mother Earth or the Earth Mother) is a personification of nature that focuses on the life-giving and nurturing aspects of nature by embodying it, in the form of a mother or mother goddess.

== European concept traditions ==
=== Greek concept ===
The Mycenaean Greek: Ma-ka (transliterated as ma-ga), "Mother Gaia", written in Linear B syllabic script (13th or 12th century BC), is the earliest known instance of the concept of earth as a mother.

Demeter would take the place of her grandmother, Gaia, and her mother, Rhea, as goddess of the earth in a time when humans and gods thought the activities of the heavens more sacred than those of earth.

— Leeming, Creation Myths of the World: An Encyclopedia

==== Greek myth of the seasons ====
In Greek mythology, Persephone, daughter of Demeter (goddess of the harvest), was abducted by Hades (god of the dead), and taken to the underworld as his queen. The myth goes on to describe Demeter as so distraught that no crops would grow and the "entire human race [would] have perished of cruel, biting hunger if Zeus had not been concerned" (Larousse 152). According to myth, Zeus forced Hades to return Persephone to her mother, but while in the underworld, Persephone had eaten pomegranate seeds, the food of the dead and thus, she must then spend part of each year with Hades in the underworld. The myth continues that Demeter's grief for her daughter in the realm of the dead, was reflected in the barren winter months and her joy when Persephone returned was reflected in the bountiful summer months

=== Ancient Rome ===
Roman Epicurean poet Lucretius opened his didactic poem De rerum natura by addressing Venus as a veritable mother of nature. Lucretius used Venus as "a personified symbol for the generative aspect of nature". This largely had to do with the nature of Lucretius' work, which presents a nontheistic understanding of the world that eschewed superstition.

=== Post-classical concept ===
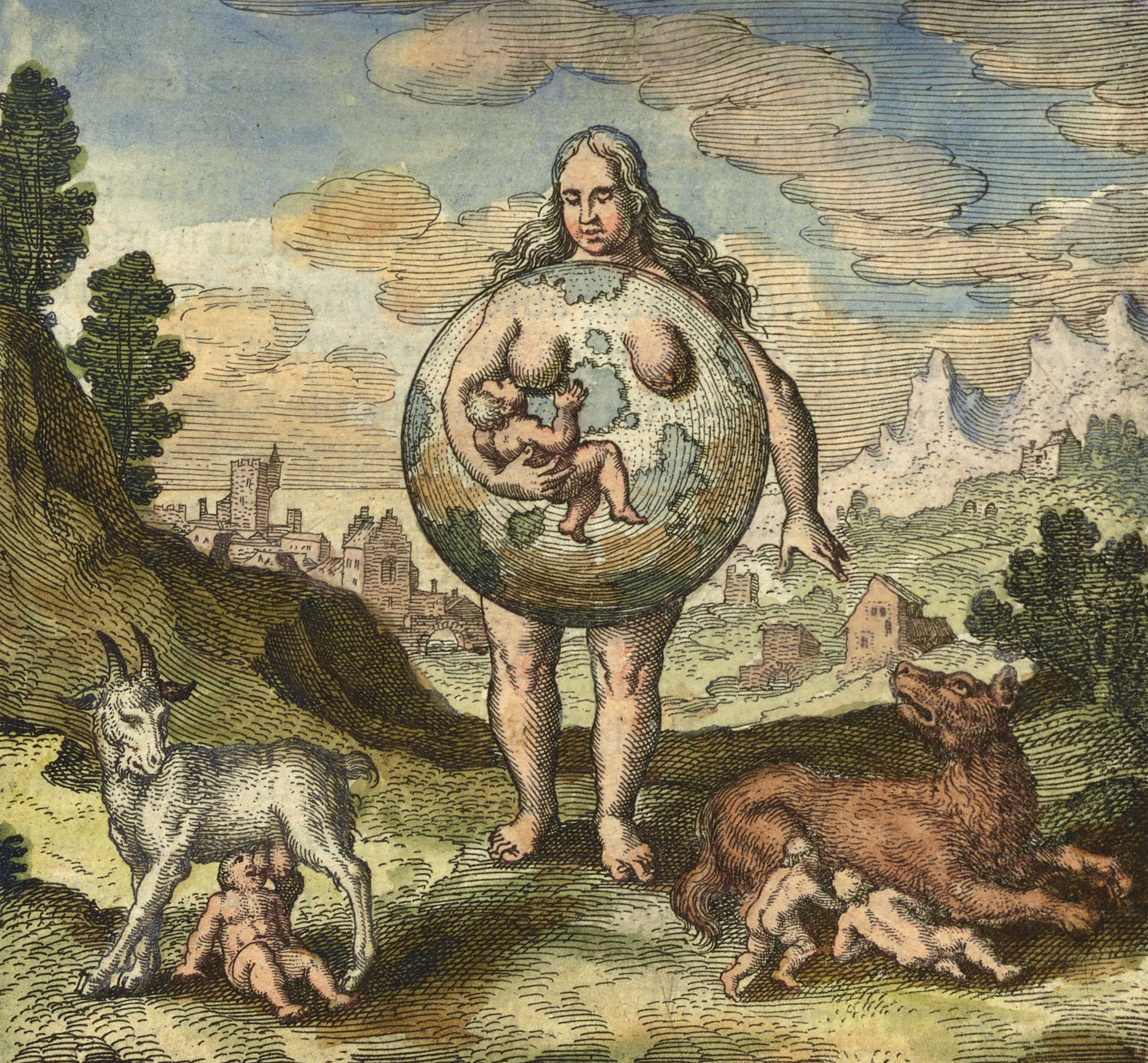
Mother Earth image, 17th century alchemical text, Atalanta Fugiens

The pre-Socratic philosophers abstracted the entirety of phenomena of the world as singular: physis, and this was inherited by Aristotle.

The word "nature" comes from the Latin word, "natura", meaning birth or character [see nature (philosophy)]. In English, its first recorded use (in the sense of the entirety of the phenomena of the world) was in 1266. "Natura" and the personification of Mother Nature were widely popular in the Middle Ages. As a concept, seated between the properly divine and the human, it can be traced to Ancient Greece, though Earth (or "Eorthe" in the Old English period) may have been personified as a goddess. The Norse also had a goddess called Jörð (Jord, or Erth).

Medieval Christian thinkers did not see nature as inclusive of everything, but thought that it had been created by God; earth lay below the unchanging heavens and moon. Nature lay somewhere in the center, with agents above her (angels), and below her (demons and hell). Francis of Assisi in his canticle “Lauds of the Creatures” c. 1224 wrote:

Laudato si, mi Signore, per sora nostra matre Terra,
la quale ne sustenta et governa,
et produce diversi fructi con coloriti fior et herba.

Lauded be You, my Lord, through our Sister Mother Earth,
who sustains and governs us,
and produces various fruits with colored flowers and herbs.

=== Basque mythology ===
Amalur (sometimes Ama Lur or Ama Lurra) was believed to be the goddess of the earth in the religion of the ancient Basque people. She was described as the mother of Ekhi, the sun, and Ilazki, the moon. Her name meant "mother earth" or "mother land"; the 1968 Basque documentary Ama lur was a celebration of the Basque countryside.

== Asian concept traditions ==
=== Southeast Asia ===
In the Mainland Southeast Asian countries of Cambodia, Laos and Thailand, earth (terra firma) is personified as Phra Mae Thorani, but is believed that her role in Buddhist mythology differs considerably from that of Mother Nature. In the Malay Archipelago, that role has been filled by Dewi Sri, The Rice-mother in the East Indies.

== American concept traditions ==
=== Indigenous peoples of North America ===
Algonquian legend says that "beneath the clouds lives the Earth-Mother from whom is derived the Water of Life, who at her bosom feeds plants, animals and human" (Larousse 428). She is otherwise known as Nokomis, the Grandmother.

In her book Coateteleco, pueblo indígena de pescadores ("Coatetelco, indigenous fishing town", Cuernavaca, Morelos: Vettoretti, 2015), Teódula Alemán Cleto states, En nuestra cultura prehispánica el respeto y la fe a nuestra madre naturaleza fueron primordiales para vivir en plena armonía como seres humanos. ("In our [Mexican] prehispanic culture, respect and faith in our Mother Nature [emphasis added] were paramount to living in full harmony as human beings.")

=== Indigenous peoples of South America ===
In Inca mythology, Mama Pacha or Pachamama was a fertility goddess who presided over planting and harvesting. Pachamama is usually translated as "Mother Earth" but a more literal translation would be "Mother Universe" (in Aymara and Quechua mama = mother / pacha = world, space-time or the universe). It was believed that Pachamama and her husband, Inti, were the most benevolent deities and were worshiped in parts of the Andean mountain ranges (stretching from present day Ecuador to Chile and Argentina).

== Popular culture ==
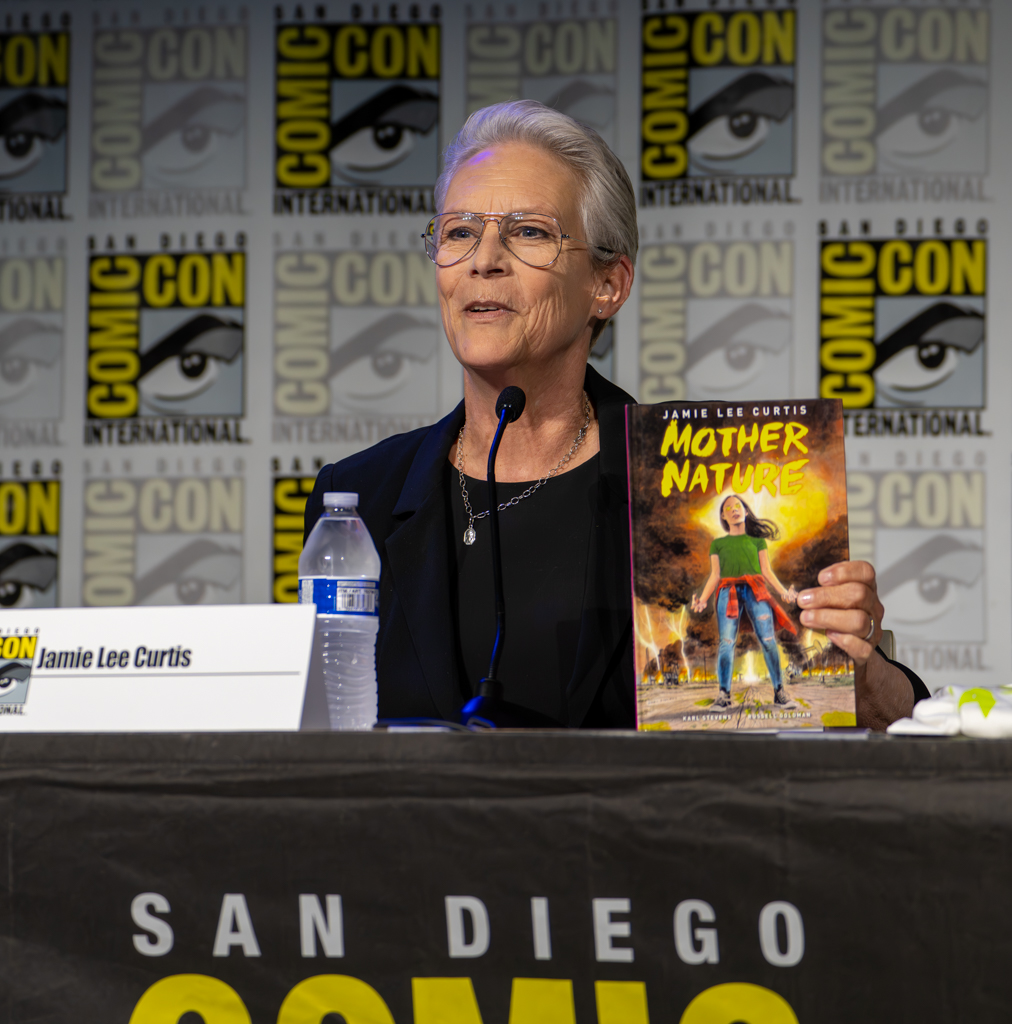
Jamie Lee Curtis with her book Mother Nature – a graphic novel

- In the early 1970s, a television ad featured character actress Dena Dietrich as Mother Nature. Vexed by an off-screen narrator who informs her she has mistaken Chiffon margarine for butter, she responded with the trademarked slogan "It's not nice to fool Mother Nature" (underscored by thunder and lightning).
- Mother Nature is featured in The Year Without a Santa Claus voiced by Rhoda Mann. This version was the mother of Heat Miser and Snow Miser. When Mrs. Claus is unable to get them to compromise on a deal regarding snow in Southtown and a brief warm-up at the North Pole, she goes to Mother Nature for help. Mother Nature intimidates her children to doing as Mrs. Claus asks from them.
  - Mother Nature appears in the live action remake of The Year Without a Santa Claus, portrayed by Carol Kane.
  - Mother Nature appears in the 2008 sequel A Miser Brothers' Christmas voiced by Patricia Hamilton. Besides Heat Miser and Snow Miser, she is also shown to be the mother of Earthquake, Thunder and Lightning, the Tides, and North Wind. In the story after Santa Claus gets injured during one of the Miser Brothers' feuds (with some part of North Wind's henchmen secretly sabotaging Santa's new sleigh), she and Mrs. Claus make the Miser Brothers work at Santa's workshop to make it up to Santa Claus.
- Mother Nature appeared as a recurring character in The Smurfs voiced by June Foray. She resides in a cottage in the Smurfs' forest.
- Mother Nature appeared as the main character in Piers Anthony's novel Being a Green Mother
- Mother Nature is often mentioned in the Garfield comic strip.
- Mother Earth appears in The Earth Day Special, portrayed by Bette Midler. In the story when she falls from the sky and faints due to the problems with nature, she is rushed to the hospital where she is tended to by Doogie Howser and other doctors.
- A song in the animated version of Charlotte's Web is titled "Mother Earth and Father Time".
- Mother Nature was featured in Happily Ever After, voiced by Phyllis Diller. She was depicted as the most powerful force of good in the movie, having complete control over nature, as well as the ability to create creatures from potions she made in her sanctuary.
- Mother Nature is a recurring character in The New Woody Woodpecker Show, voiced by B. J. Ward. She was depicted as a fairy who often makes sure that Woody Woodpecker is doing his part in nature.
- Mother Nature was a supporting character in The Santa Clause 2 and The Santa Clause 3: The Escape Clause, portrayed by Aisha Tyler. She was shown as the head leader of the Council of Legendary Figures (which also consists of Santa Claus, the Easter Bunny, Cupid, Father Time, the Sandman, the Tooth Fairy, and Jack Frost).
- Mother Nature was featured in John Hancock written by Bo Bissett. She was referred to as Tara, a tribute to her name in Roman Mythology which was Terra or Terra Mater.
- Mother Nature was a recurring character featured in Stargate SG-1 where she was portrayed as an ascended Ancient called Oma Desala.
- The animated film Epic featured a character named Queen Tara (voiced by Beyoncé Knowles) who was a Mother Nature-like being.
- Mother Nature was a character in the Guardians of Childhood series by William Joyce. The long-lost daughter of the Boogieman Pitch, she was a young woman who could control phenomenons of nature. She stayed hidden while she watched the world. Her character was expanded in the latest book The Sandman and the War of Dreams.
- Mother Nature appeared in a major recurring role in the seventh season of Once Upon a Time. Mother Nature was a title for the leader of the dryads. In the story, the previous Mother Nature was Mother Flora (portrayed by Gabrielle Miller). Following the death of Mother Flora at the hands of some humans, Gothel (portrayed by Emma Booth) became the next Mother Nature.
- Jamie Lee Curtis co-wrote a graphic novel called "Mother Nature".

== See also ==
- Amalur
- Atabey (goddess)
- Ecofeminism
- Father Time
- Gaia
- Gaia hypothesis
- Jörð
- Mother goddess
- Pantheism
- Prakṛti
