= Meri (mythology) =

In the mythology of the Bororó people of Brazil, Meri is a folk hero and sun-god.

A crater on Saturn's moon Hyperion has been named after him .

== See also ==
- List of solar deities
