= Australian Aboriginal Astronomy Project =

The Australian Aboriginal Astronomy Project is a collaboration of academics, educators, and Indigenous elders researching the astronomical traditions and knowledge of Indigenous Australians, commonly termed Australian Aboriginal astronomy. This research in cultural astronomy covers the disciplines of archaeoastronomy, ethnoastronomy, historical astronomy, geomythology, and Indigenous knowledge. Their work encompasses the cultural significance of astronomy within indigenous communities, while simultaneously maintaining the continuation of indigenous knowledge that astronomy encompasses.

In 2021, asteroid 10040 Ghillar was named in honour of Ghillar Michael Anderson, an elder of the Euahlayi people, who has collaborated with academic astronomers Robert Fuller and Duane Hamacher in sharing and documenting traditional star knowledge of the Kamilaroi and Euahlayi people.
