= Walu (goddess) =

Walu is a sun deity in the mythology of the Yolŋu of Arnhem Land.

Walu was believed to light a small fire each morning and paint herself with red ochre. She would then carry a torch from east to west, extinguish the source, and return to her camp in the east. One legend describes her as living with her daughter, Bara. Bara accompanied her across the Sun every day, but Walu realized she made the Earth too hot and made her stop.

== See also ==
- List of solar deities
