= Yhi =

Goddess in Australian Aboriginal mythology

In Gamilaraay mythology, Yhi (sometimes also rendered Yarai/Yaay) is a female creator spirit and personification of the sun. She chases Bahloo (the moon) across the sky; eclipses are said to happen when she catches up to him.

According to a creation story associated with her, Yhi slept until a whistle awakened her. When she opened her eyes, light fell on the Earth. Plants grew where she walked. She decided that, in addition to plants, she would make something that could dance. Searching for such an organism, Yhi found evil spirits beneath the earth who tried to sing her to death. But her warmth chased away the darkness, which was transformed into insects. She brought them to Earth and then found some ice caves in a mountain. She shone her light on the being resting inside and fishes and lizards came out, along with many kinds of birds, mammals and amphibians.

She then returned to her own world and blessed her creations with the change of the seasons and promised that, when they died, they would join her in the sky. When she disappeared, darkness came back and covered the Earth. The organisms thought she was not returning and were sad, but then came the first sunrise and Yhi returned.

Much later, the animals missed Yhi and she decided to return to ask them what was wrong. Kangaroo wanted to jump and Wombat wanted to wiggle on the ground, while Seal wanted to swim. Lizard wanted legs and Bat wanted wings, and the Platypus wanted something of everything. Yhi granted them what they wished, then returned to the sky and saw the Man, who had no woman and was unlike anything else she had created. While the man slept, Yhi turned all her power on a flower and soon, the man woke up and, joined by all the other animals, watched her. The flower then turned into a woman.

== See also ==
- List of solar deities
