= Ceraon =

Demi-god of wine-mixing

Ceraon (Ancient Greek: Κεραων; aka Keraon) in Greek mythology is a demi-god of the meal, specifically the mixing of wine.

Polemos says that in Mounykhia (Munychia) honours are paid to a hero Akratopotes (Drinker of Unmixed Wine), and that among the Spartans, statues of heroes named Matton (Kneader) and Keraon (Ceraon) (Mixer) have been set up by certain cooks in the public mess. In Akhaia (Achaea), also, Deipneus, who got his name from deipna (Dinners), is held in honour.

— Athenaeus, Deipnosophistae 1. 39c - 39d (trans. Gullick) (Greek rhetorician 2nd to 3rd centuries AD)

== See also ==
- Deipneus, Ancient Greek demigod of Bread-Baking
- Matton, Ancient Greek demigod of Dough-kneading
