= Lists of deities =

This is an index of lists of deities of the different cultures, religions, and mythologies of the world.

- List of deities by classification
- Lists of deities by cultural sphere
- List of fictional deities
- List of goddesses
- List of people who have been considered deities
- List of pharaohs deified during lifetime
