= Eate =

Eate is a storm god worshipped by the ancient Basques. In some sources he is also the god of fire and ice.
