= Gnowee =

Female personification of the Sun

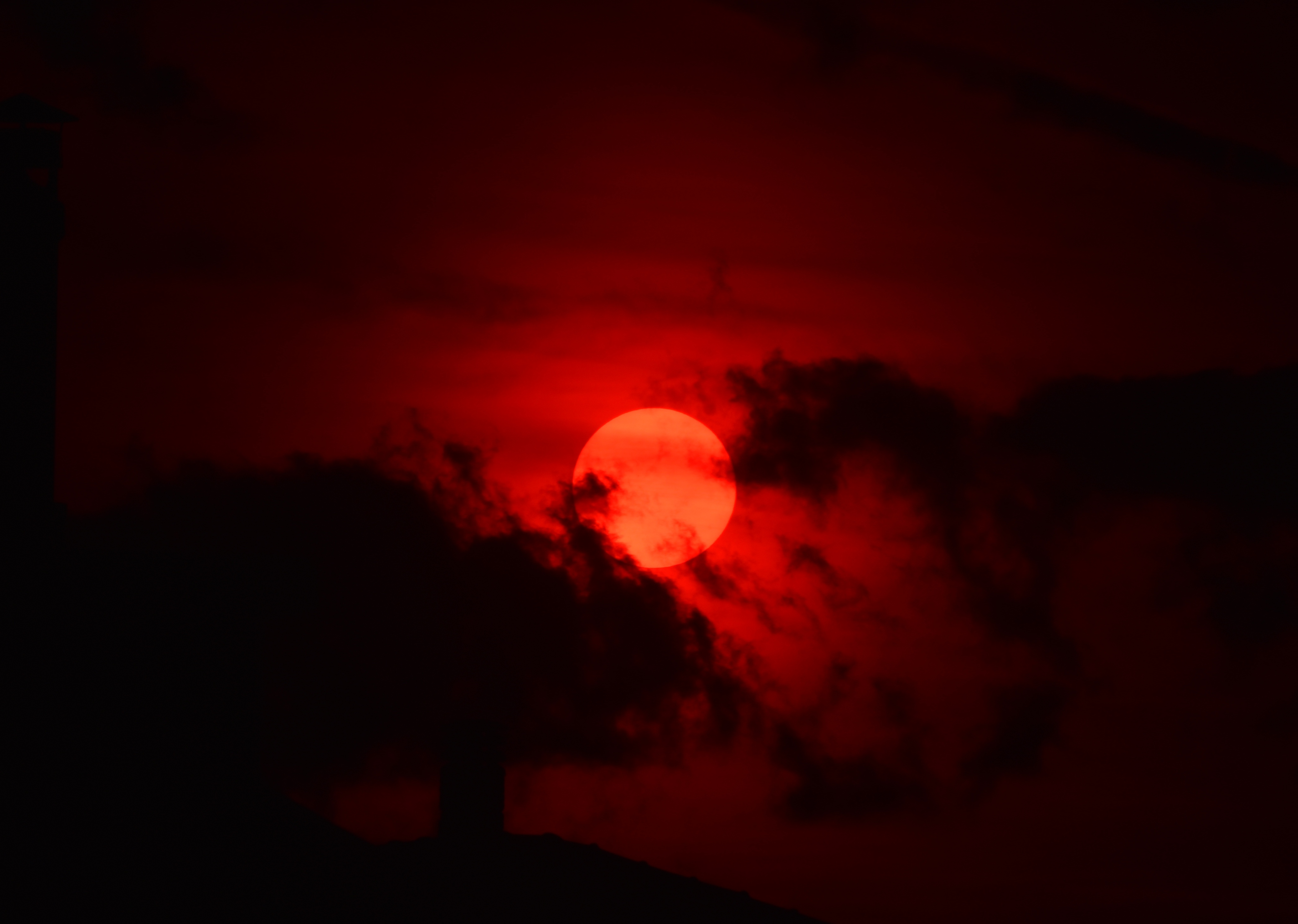
The sun

In Wotjobaluk mythology, Gnowee is a female personification of the Sun. She was once a woman who lived upon the Earth at a time when it was eternally dark, and people could only move about with the aid of bark torches. One day, she left her little son sleeping while she went out to dig for yams. Food was scarce, and Gnowee wandered so far that she reached the end of the Earth, passed under it and emerged on the other side. Not knowing where she was, she could not find her little son anywhere, so she climbed into the sky with her great bark torch to get a clearer view. She still wanders the sky to this day, lighting the whole world with her torch as she continues to search for her lost son.

== See also ==
- Wuriupranili
