= Gaueko =

In Basque mythology, Gaueko is the spirit of the night. He does not allow humans to do certain works outside the house during the night. He especially punishes all those who try to show off as brave in the night, boasting of not fearing the darkness. He is considered to be a devil in some accounts, a jentil or gentilic divinity in others. In some cases he makes his presence felt as a gust of wind, as he pronounces these words: Gaua Gauekoarentzat, eguna egunezkoarentzat ("the night for Gaueko (the one of the night), the day for the one of the day"). Sometimes he appears in the shape of a cow, sometimes in that of a monster.

In Basque, Gaueko literally means "of the night".
