= List of pantheons =

Following is a list of pantheons of deities in specific spiritual practices:

- African pantheons
- Armenian pantheon
- Aztec pantheon
- Buddhist pantheon
- Berber pantheon
- Burmese pantheon
- Canaanite pantheon
- Celtic pantheon
- Chinese pantheon
- Egyptian pantheon
- Germanic pantheon
- Greek pantheon
- Guanche pantheon
- Hindu pantheon
- Incan pantheon
- Inuit pantheon
- Irish pantheon
- Jain pantheon
- Japanese pantheon
- Japanese Buddhist pantheon
- Maya pantheon
- Native American pantheons
- Norse pantheon
- Rigvedic pantheon
- Roman pantheon
- Slavic pantheon
- Sumerian pantheon
- Yoruba pantheon

== See also ==
- Divine Council
- Mesopotamian myths
- List of religions
- William Blake's mythology
