= Gaizkiñ =

In Basque mythology, Gaizkiñ is an evil spirit that causes diseases.
