= Orko (deity) =

Orko is a thunder god in ancient Basque mythology. The name is derived from Orkeguna, the Basque word for Thursday.
