= Inguma =

God of dreams in Basque mythology and religion

Inguma (Mauma in Baigorri) is the god of dreams in Basque mythology and religion. He is regarded as a malevolent force who enters houses at night and plagues residents with nightmares, sometimes killing them. He is mentioned in Ofrenda a la tormenta (Offering to the Storm), the third film in the Baztán trilogy by Dolores Redondo.
