= Eki (goddess) =

Basque divinity

Eki (also Ekhi, Eguzki, Iuski, Iguzki, Iduzki or Eguzku) are the names of the Sun in the Basque language. In Basque mythology, Eki or Eguzki is seen as a daughter of Mother Earth to whom she returns daily.

She was regarded as the protector of humanity and the enemy of all evil spirits. The ancient Basques called her "grandmother" and held rites in her honour at sunset. They believed that when the sun set, Ekhi travelled into Itxasgorrieta ("The Reddish Seas") beneath the earth into the womb of Amalur or Lurbira, her mother.

== See also ==
- List of solar deities
