= Wuriupranili =

In the mythology of the Tiwi people of northern Australia, the Sun Woman Wuriupranili (or Wuriunpranilli) is a solar goddess whose stringybark torch is the Sun. When she wakes each morning in the east, she lights a small fire, which mankind sees as the first glow of dawn. She then decorates her face and body with red ochre. Often, the pigment is blown into the air where it stains the clouds, resulting in a red sunrise. As Wuriupranili prepares herself for her journey across the sky, the birds break into song, waking the men and women. Finally, she lights her stringybark torch from the campfire, then travels across the sky to her evening camp in the west. When she disappears below the western horizon, she puts out her torch and redecorates her body with ochre, causing brilliantly coloured sunsets. As night settles, she returns to her eastern morning camp via a tunnel.

== See also ==
- List of solar deities
