= Amalur =

Goddess of Earth in Basque mythology

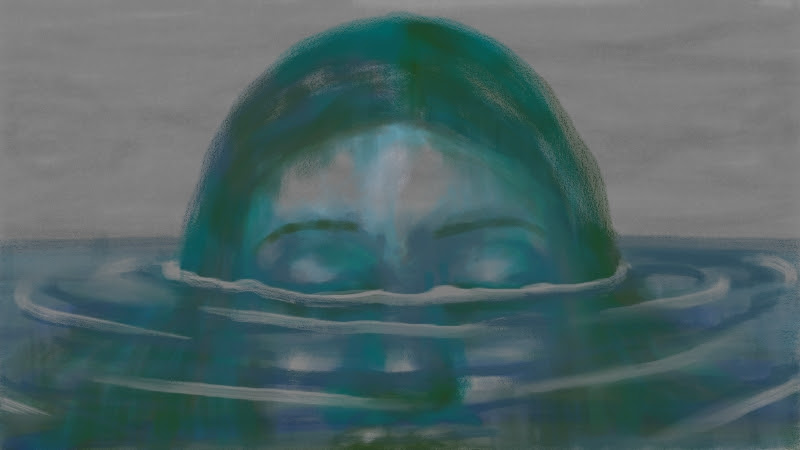
Amalur

Amalur or Ama Lurra (Basque for "Mother Earth"), is the mother of Ekhi, the sun, and Ilazki, the moon, in Basque mythology. She is the home not only of living beings, but also of mythological creatures, divinities and souls. Amalur (Mother Earth) sustains the life of plants and animals. She holds amazing treasures in her bosom.

The 1968 Basque documentary Ama lur was a celebration of the Basque countryside.

== Myths and legends ==
As the primary deity of the Basque mythos, Amalur holds the life force that powers the world. Her power allows life to exist, so faith in her is very important among Basques, predating the Indo-European migrations into Iberia. Amalur also created other deities. She created Ekhi, the sun, and Ilargi, the moon. She also created the stemless carline thistle, a species of sunflower important to the Basques, as it was believed that putting it on one's door would scare malicious spirits away.

According to mythology, the center of Amalur is wealthy with many treasures. These treasures could be accessed through various caves, and that although humans look for them, they cannot find them.
