= Latis =

Name of two Celtic deities

In ancient Celtic polytheism, Latis is the name of two Celtic deities worshipped in Roman Britain. One is a goddess (Dea Latis), the other a god (Deus Latis), and they are both known from a single inscription each.

== Dea Latis ==
The dedication to Dea Latis was found at Birdoswald Roman Fort in Cumbria, England, in 1873. It reads simply:

DIE LATI For the goddess Latis.

The E is written as a ||. The stone is now in the Carlisle Museum.

She may have been associated with the nearby rivers.

== Deus Latis ==
The dedication to Deus Latis, recovered on an altar-stone at the Roman fort of Aballava, Burgh-by-Sands (also in Cumbria) reads:

DEO LATI LVCIVS VRSEI To the god Latis, Lucius Ursei [dedicates this].

The altar-stone to Deus Latis was found near an image of a horned god and another dedication to the god Belatucadros.

== Etymology ==
The name 'Latis' may conceivably be related to the Proto-Celtic words *lati- meaning 'liquor', *lat- 'day', or *lāto- 'lust'.
