= Anthony Aveni =

American astronomer and anthropologist (born 1938)

Anthony Francis Aveni (born 1938) is an American academic anthropologist, astronomer, and author, noted in particular for his extensive publications and contributions to the fields of archaeoastronomy and cultural astronomy. He is Russell Colgate Distinguished University Professor of Astronomy and Anthropology and Native American Studies, Emeritus at Colgate University, and he is the author of more than 34 books and 300 research publications that include three cover articles in Science magazine.

== Education ==
Aveni earned his Bachelor of Arts from Boston University in 1960 and a PhD from the University of Arizona in 1965.

== Career ==
Aveni began teaching at Colgate University in Hamilton, New York in 1963. He founded the university's astronomy program, and he rose to the named chair of Russell Colgate Distinguished University Professor of Astronomy and Anthropology and Native American Studies before retiring emeritus.

Aveni is recognized for his influence on the development of archaeoastronomy and cultural astronomy as disciplines in the latter 20th century. He has specialized in the study of ancient astronomical practices in the Americas, and pioneered research into the historical astronomy of pre-Columbian Mesoamerican cultures.

Aveni has authored more than 34 books and 300 research publications, including three cover articles in Science and works in American Scientist, American Antiquity, Latin American Antiquity, The Sciences, Advances in Archaeological Method and Theory, and Journal of Archaeological Research. Two of his short pieces were selected as "notable essays" in the volumes The Best American Essays 2002 and Best American Science Writing 2002. He has been awarded research grants by the National Geographic Society, the National Science Foundation and various private foundations for work in both American continents as well as in Europe and the Middle East.

== Personal life ==
Aveni lives in Hamilton, New York, with his wife Lorraine, an artist.

== Selected publications ==
=== Articles ===
- Aveni, Anthony F.; Gibbs, Sharon L.; Hartung, Horst (6 June 1975). "The Caracol Tower at Chichen Itza: An Ancient Astronomical Observatory?". Science. 188 (4192): 977–985. doi:10.1126/science.188.4192.977. Cover.
- Aveni, Anthony F.; Hartung, Horst; Buckingham, Beth (20 October 1978). "The Pecked Cross Symbol in Ancient Mesoamerica". Science. 202 (4365): 267–286. doi:10.1126/science.202.4365.267. Cover.
- Aveni, Anthony F. (1981). "Archaeoastronomy". Advances in Archaeological Method and Theory. 4: 1–77. JSTOR 20170165.
- Aveni, Anthony F. (2003). "Archaeoastronomy in the Ancient Americas". Journal of Archaeological Research. 11 (2): 149–191. JSTOR 41053196.

=== Books ===
- Skywatchers of Ancient Mexico (University of Texas Press, 1980) (translations in German, Italian, Chinese, Korean, Spanish, Polish, Portuguese)
- World Archaeoastronomy (editor) (Cambridge University Press, 1988)
- Empires of Time (Basic Books, 1989)
- The Lines of Nazca (editor) (American Philosophical Society, 1990)
- Ancient Astronomers (Smithsonian, 1992)
- Conversing With the Planets (Times, Random House, 1992)
- Behind the Crystal Ball (Times, 1996)
- Stairways to the Stars (Wiley, 1997)
- Skywatchers : A Revised and Updated Version of Skywatchers of Ancient Mexico (University of Texas Press, 2001)
- The Book of the Year: A Brief History of Our Seasonal Holidays (Oxford University Press, 2002)
- The Madrid Codex: New Approaches to Understanding an Ancient Maya Manuscript (edited with Gabrielle Vail) (University Press of Colorado, 2004)
- Foundations of New World Cultural Astronomy (Scholastic, 2005)
- The First Americans: Where They Came From and Who They Became (Scholastic, 2005)
- People and the Sky: Our Ancestors and the Cosmos (Thames & Hudson, 2008)
- Foundations of New World Cultural Astronomy: A Reader With Commentary (editor) (University Press of Colorado, 2008)
- Buried Beneath Us: Discovering the Ancient Cities of the Americas (Roaring Brook Press, 2013)
- The End of Time: The Maya Mystery of 2012 (University Press of Colorado, 2009)

== Distinctions ==
- Member, American Association for the Advancement of Science (1980)
- National Professor of the Year – Council for Advancement and Support of Education (1982)
- Rolling Stone's "10 Best Professors of the Year" list – Rolling Stone (1991)
- The H. B. Nicholson Award for Excellence in Mesoamerican Studies – The Peabody Museum and the Moses Mesoamerican Archive at Harvard University (2004)
- The Fryxell Award for Interdisciplinary Research – The Society for American Archaeology (2013)
