= SIAC =

SIAC is an acronym used by several bodies:

- Securities Industry Automation Corporation, a subsidiary of the NYSE Euronext
- Singapore International Arbitration Centre, a not-for-profit international arbitration organisation
- Sistema Integrado de Artilleria de Campaña (English: Integrated Field Artillery System), a modern field howitzer, manufactured in Spain
- Sociedad Interamericana de Astronomía en la Cultura, an organization in the field of cultural astronomy in the Americas
- Southern Indiana Athletic Conference, an American high school athletic conference
- Southern Intercollegiate Athletic Conference, an NCAA Division II collegiate athletic conference, in the Southern United States
- Special Immigration Appeals Commission, a superior court of record in the United Kingdom

== See also ==
- SIA (disambiguation)
