= Elizabeth Baity =

American children's author

- Born: Elizabeth Estella Chesley; March 5, 1907; Hamilton, Texas, US
- Died: October 7, 1989 (aged 82); Solana Beach, California, US
- Occupations: Author, academic
- Spouse: Herman Baity (m. 1930)
- Writing career
- Genre: Children's literature

Elizabeth Chesley Baity (1907–1989) was an American academic and children's author. Her book Americans Before Columbus was a Newbery Honor recipient in 1952.

== Biography ==
Elizabeth Chesley was born in Hamilton, Texas, where she grew up and attended school. She attended Texas University for Women. In 1930, she married Herman Baity.

Baity published her first book, Man Is A Weaver, with Viking Press in 1941. This was followed by Americans Before Columbus, an overview of the subject for children, published in 1951. Americans Before Columbus was named a Newbery Honor book the following year. A further volume, America Before Man, came out in 1953, and appeared on the "Best Books of the Year" list produced by The Horn Book Magazine.

In addition to writing, Baity taught at the University of North Carolina. She was a noted researcher and author in the field of archaeoastronomy.

Baity died in 1989, at the age of 82.

== Publications ==
- Man Is A Weaver. Viking. 1941.
- Americans Before Coiumbus. Viking. 1951.
- American Before Man. Viking. 1953.
