= Americans Before Columbus =

Nonfiction children's book by Elizabeth Baity

- First edition (publ. Viking Press)
- Author: Elizabeth Chesley Baity
- Illustrator: C. B. Falls
- Publisher: Viking Press
- Publication date: April 27, 1951
- Award: Newbery Honor (1952)
- ISBN: 9780670121663

Americans Before Columbus by Elizabeth Baity is a children's book about the history of pre-Columbian cultures in America, with illustrations by C. B. Falls. It was published in 1951 and was a Newbery Honor recipient in 1952. The book covers the history of early communities in South America and Mesoamerica from the Ice Age until the Spanish colonization of the Americas. Focusing on the Aztecs, the Mayans, the Iroquois, and the Incas, Baity also compares how these communities compare with readers in more modern times.

== Summary ==
Americans Before Columbus begins by discussing the Ice Age and how humans crossed the Bering Strait and reached the New World. Archeologists gained clues about this from the artifacts people behind, such as cave art, baskets, and stone weapons.

After hundreds of years of spreading out across the continents in the western hemisphere, some groups began to settle. Communities including the cliff dwelling basket makers in the Rocky Mountains, the citadel hunter/gatherers in Mexico, and the Incas in the south began to establish local customs and behaviors. These included religion, social hierarchies, and ways of maintaining one's home.

Drawing on the work of archaeologists, scientists, and photographers, Elizabeth Baity explains how early communities came to be, and how modern day people were able to discover and learn about them.

== Reception ==
Americans Before Columbus received a starred review from Kirkus Reviews, who called it a "thrilling notebook" and noted, "The writing is informal, but covers a great amount of material, and the author never attempts to stifle her enthusiasm for the subject". They concluded by saying it is "a deep dish with a eady flavor -- a future staple on history shelves, and a tempting first glimpse at the science of archeology."
