= List of artifacts significant to archaeoastronomy =

Artifacts significant to archaeoastronomy include objects interpreted or proposed as having astronomical or calendrical significance. The examples listed come from archaeological contexts and include representations of celestial phenomena, proposed calendars and time-reckoning information, and devices for plotting the positions of celestial bodies.

== List ==
- Adorant from the Geißenklösterle cave – carved mammoth tusk 'plate' with proposed figurative asterism; combined with notched denotations relating to time-reckoning. The cave is in the Swabian Jura, Germany.
- Antikythera mechanism – A device for plotting positions of heavenly bodies. Discovered off the island of Antikythera, Greece
- Book of Silk – Drawings of comets unearthed from Han tomb number 3 at Mawangdui Han tombs site, Changsha, China
- Golden hats – Tall conical hats said to be embossed with symbols of astronomical significance from Bronze Age Central Europe
- Grooves (archaeology) - grooves found in rock in northern Europe and particularly on Gotland, Sweden
- Nebra sky disk – A bronze disc said to date from the Bronze Age which portrays the cosmos. From Nebra, Germany
- Thaïs Bone – a proposed lunisolar calendar notched onto a bovine rib fragment; deposited in the early Azilian culture. Discovered in the Thaïs cave (Grotte de Thaïs), Département de la Drôme, France.
- Trundholm sun chariot – A bronze sun disc pulled by a horse from Trundholm, Zealand, Denmark
