= Sociedad Interamericana de Astronomía en la Cultura =

Organization

- File:SIAClogoofficial.png SIAC logo

La Sociedad Interamericana de Astronomía en la Cultura (SIAC) is an organization dedicated to bringing together professionals in the field of cultural astronomy in the Americas.

== History ==
SIAC was founded during the Symposium on Ethno- and Archaeoastronomy of the International Congress of Americanists (Simposio de etno y arqueoastronomía del Congreso Internacional de Americanistas) in Santiago, Chile, in 2003. During this meeting, present researchers discussed the necessity of having a professional organization in Latin America dedicated to cultural astronomy and founded the organization. In 2011, the organization applied for and received grant funding and began to organize more meetings.

== Mission and activities ==
This is the logo of SIAC (Sociedad Interamericana de Astronomía en la Cultura)

The main objective of SIAC is to promote the exchange and development of interdisciplinary research concerning astronomical knowledge and practices in their cultural context, as an important contribution to understanding the relationships between human societies and the environment in which they are located.

SIAC seeks to promote professional meetings (congresses, workshops, schools) and activities in cultural astronomy in the Americas. As of 2024, the Society has members from 13 countries, most of them in Latin America. Together with SEAC (Société Européenne pour l'Astronomie dans la Culture) and ISSAC (International Society for Archaeoastronomy and Astronomy in Culture), SIAC is one of the three international associations of cultural astronomy.

SIAC also keeps a catalog of publications that includes books, magazines, and newsletters.

SIAC held a conference from September 14-20, 2026 in Rio de Janeiro with the theme "Under the Skies of the Global South." One panel with representatives from the Tukano, Desana, and Baniwa peoples demonstrated how observing constellations can positively impact and guide environmental management.
