= Cultural astronomy =

Astronomy according to different cultures

Cultural astronomy, sometimes called the study of Astronomy in Culture, has been described as investigating "the diversity of ways in which cultures, both ancient and modern, perceive celestial objects and integrate them into their view of the world." As such, it encompasses the interdisciplinary fields studying the astronomies of current or ancient societies and cultures. It developed from the two interdisciplinary fields of archaeoastronomy, the study of the use of astronomy and its role in ancient cultures and civilizations, and ethnoastronomy, "a closely allied research field which merges astronomy, textual scholarship, ethnology, and the interpretation of ancient iconography for the purpose of reconstructing lifeways, astronomical techniques, and rituals." Cultural astronomy is also related to historical astronomy (analyzing historical astronomical data), history of astronomy (understanding and study and evolution of the discipline of astronomy over the course of human knowledge) and history of astrology (investigating relationships between astrology and astronomy).

Research on cultural astronomy may be published in the Journal of Astronomy in Culture, which was established in 2016 by the International Society for Archaeoastronomy and Astronomy in Culture (ISAAC).

== Examples ==
- Ancient Greek astronomy
- Astronomy in the medieval Islamic world
- Australian Aboriginal astronomy
- Babylonian astronomy
- Chinese astronomy
- Egyptian astronomy
- Hebrew astronomy
- Indian astronomy
- Maya astronomy
- Inuit astronomy
- Persian astronomy
- Serbian folk astronomy
- Tibetan astronomy
- Nakh peoples#Cosmology_and_creation

== See also ==
- Archaeoastronomy
