= Historical astronomy =

Historical astronomy is the science of analysing historic astronomical data. The American Astronomical Society (AAS), established 1899, states that its Historical Astronomy Division "...shall exist for the purpose of advancing interest in topics relating to the historical nature of astronomy. By historical astronomy we include the history of astronomy; what has come to be known as archaeoastronomy; and the application of historical records to modern astrophysical problems." Historical and ancient observations are used to track theoretically long-term trends, such as eclipse patterns and the velocity of nebular clouds. Conversely, using known and well documented phenomenological activity, historical astronomers apply computer models to verify the validity of ancient observations, as well as dating such observations and documents which would otherwise be unknown.

== Examples ==
- One example of such study would be the Crab Nebula, which is the remains of a supernova of July 1054, the SN 1054. During the Northern Song dynasty in China, a historical astronomical record was written, which lists unusual phenomena observed in the night sky. The event was also recorded by Japanese and Arab astronomers. Scholars often associate this with the formation of the Crab Nebula. [3]
- Secondly, The astronomer Edmond Halley employed this science to deduce that three comets that appeared roughly 76 years apart were in fact the same object.
- Similarly, the dwarf planet Pluto was found to have been photographed as early as 1915 although it was not recognized until 1930.
- Quasars have been photographed since the late 19th century although they were not known to be unusual objects until the 1960s.

== See also ==
- Archaeoastronomy
- Astronomical chronology
- Astronomical interferometer
- Cultural astronomy
- F. Richard Stephenson
- History of astronomy
