= The Sophia Centre =

Bath Spa University astronomy unit

The Sophia Centre was founded at the School of Historical and Cultural Studies at Bath Spa University in 2002, as the first university centre in the world to teach cultural astronomy (defined as "the study of the application of beliefs about the stars to all aspects of human culture, from religion and science to the arts and literature") and the history and culture of astrology.

== Background and current status ==
In 2004, Michael York, the centre's director, was appointed the world's first professor of cultural astronomy and astrology. In 2008 the Centre transferred to the University of Wales, Lampeter. The centre is now in the Department of Archaeology, History and Anthropology at the renamed University of Wales Trinity Saint David (formed by the merger of the University of Wales, Lampeter and the Trinity College Carmarthen.

The current director of the Sophia Centre is Nicholas Campion. The centre's teaching, via the MA in Cultural Astronomy and Astrology, is based in a wide view of astronomy and astrology as providing a framework for culture, and the analysis of the way in which cosmos provides a reference for human activity. The centre began teaching archaeoastronomy in 2010 and holds an annual conference from which several volumes of proceedings have been published (see below).

== Publications ==
The centre is associated with the Sophia Centre Press and publishes the bi-annual journal, Culture and Cosmos.

Volumes of conference proceedings include:

- Campion, Nicholas, Patrick Curry and Michael York (eds.) Astrology and the Academy, papers from the inaugural conference of the Sophia Centre, Bath Spa University College, 13–14 June 2003. Bristol: Cinnabar Books 2004. ISBN 1-898485-07-0.
- Campion, Nicholas and Patrick Curry (eds.), Sky and Psyche: The Relationship between Cosmos and Consciousness, Edinburgh: Floris Books 2006. ISBN 0-86315-566-9.
- Campion, Nicholas (ed.), Cosmologies: Proceedings of the seventh Sophia Centre Conference, Lampeter: Sophia Centre Press, 2010. ISBN 978-1-907767-00-5.
