= Tibetan astronomy =

Study of space in Tibet

Tibetan astronomy describes the study of space in Tibet. Its religious elements are strongly influenced by Buddhism, and by both Chinese astronomy and Indian astronomy.

== History ==
One story describes that study of the cosmos began in Tibet because an old woman, who spun yak wool every day and every hour of the night with enough moonlight. She noticed there were different amounts of moonlight each night and sunlight each day and began to track this to plan her spinning.

In 1318, the 3rd Karmapa received a vision of Kalachakra which he used to introduce a revised system of astronomy and astrology named the "Tsurphu Tradition of Astrology" (Standard Tibetan: Tsur-tsi) which is still used in the Karma Kagyu school for the calculation of the Tibetan calendar.

== Description of cosmos ==
The Buddhist Tantra of Kalachakra is the basis of Tibetan astronomy. It explains some phenomena in a similar manner as modern astronomy science. Hence, Sun eclipse is described as the Moon passing between the Sun and the Earth.

Tibetan astronomy describes methods for predicting eclipses, planet position, and building a calendar.
