= History of Póvoa de Varzim =

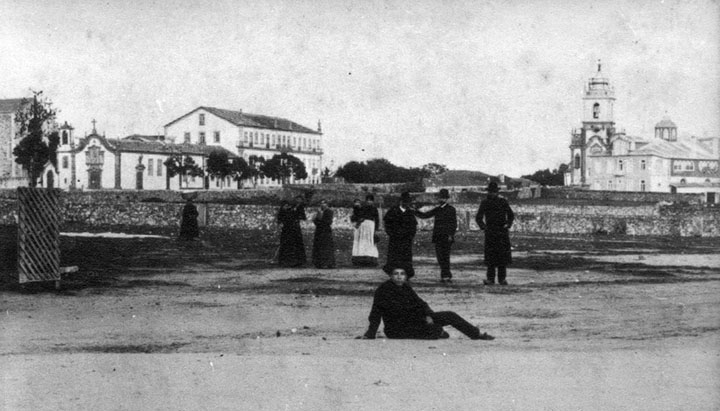
Old Town of Varzim, probable site of a Roman villa which prompted the development of the modern city.

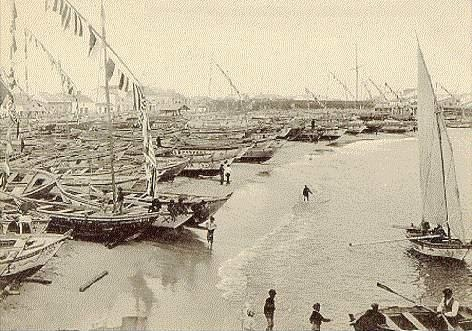
The Port of Póvoa de Varzim.

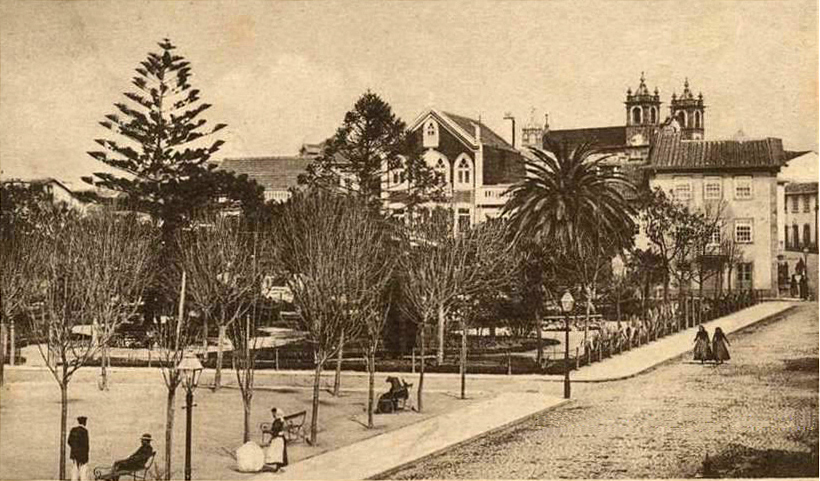
The public garden of Praça do Almada, the civic center, around 1919.

The history of Póvoa de Varzim, Portugal, and its development as a maritime trade and fishing hub, have been greatly influenced by its location at the entrance to one of Portugal's best natural ports.

Permanent settlement in the coastal plain of Póvoa de Varzim dates back to around four to six thousand years ago; around 900 BC, unrest in the region led to the establishment of a fortified city. The ocean has played an important part in its popular culture and economy, through maritime trade and fishing, leading it to establish a fiefdom in the 10th or 11th century, a municipality in 1308 and to become, in the 18th century, the main fishing port in northern Portugal.

Póvoa de Varzim and its region had relevant input that allowed the Portuguese discoveries, throw manpower, shipbuilding and seafaring knowledge. Since the 18th century, its beaches have helped it become one of the main tourist areas of the region, which prompted high-culture development since the late 18th century. Its development suffered setbacks due to feudalism, monastic domain, border disputes and, recently, the development of a highly centralized state. However, it gained significant privileges confirmed by successive Portuguese kings such as town limit exception and royal appeal rights.

== Stone Age settlers Prehistory–900 B.C. ==
Discoveries of Acheulean stone tools suggest Póvoa de Varzim has been inhabited since the Lower Palaeolithic, around 200,000 BC. The earliest artifacts, dating to the Paleolithic, were found in Northern Aver-o-Mar, proving the strong attractiveness that the ocean played since very remote eras.

The first groups of shepherds settled on the coast where Póvoa de Varzim is now located between the 4th millennium and early 2nd millennium BC. Their dead were deposited in tumuli, which are the oldest monuments found in the municipality. The necropolis, with seven tumuli, dated to end of the Neolithic, early Chalcolithic. Four around São Félix Hill, all have been broken, and three around Cividade Hill, including Mamoa de Sejães, in the hillside, that is still unopened after thousands of years of settlement. Five of the known tumuli are still visible. There's also evidence of Stone Age painting in Cape Santo André.

== Castro culture urbanization and maritime trade 900–138 B.C. ==
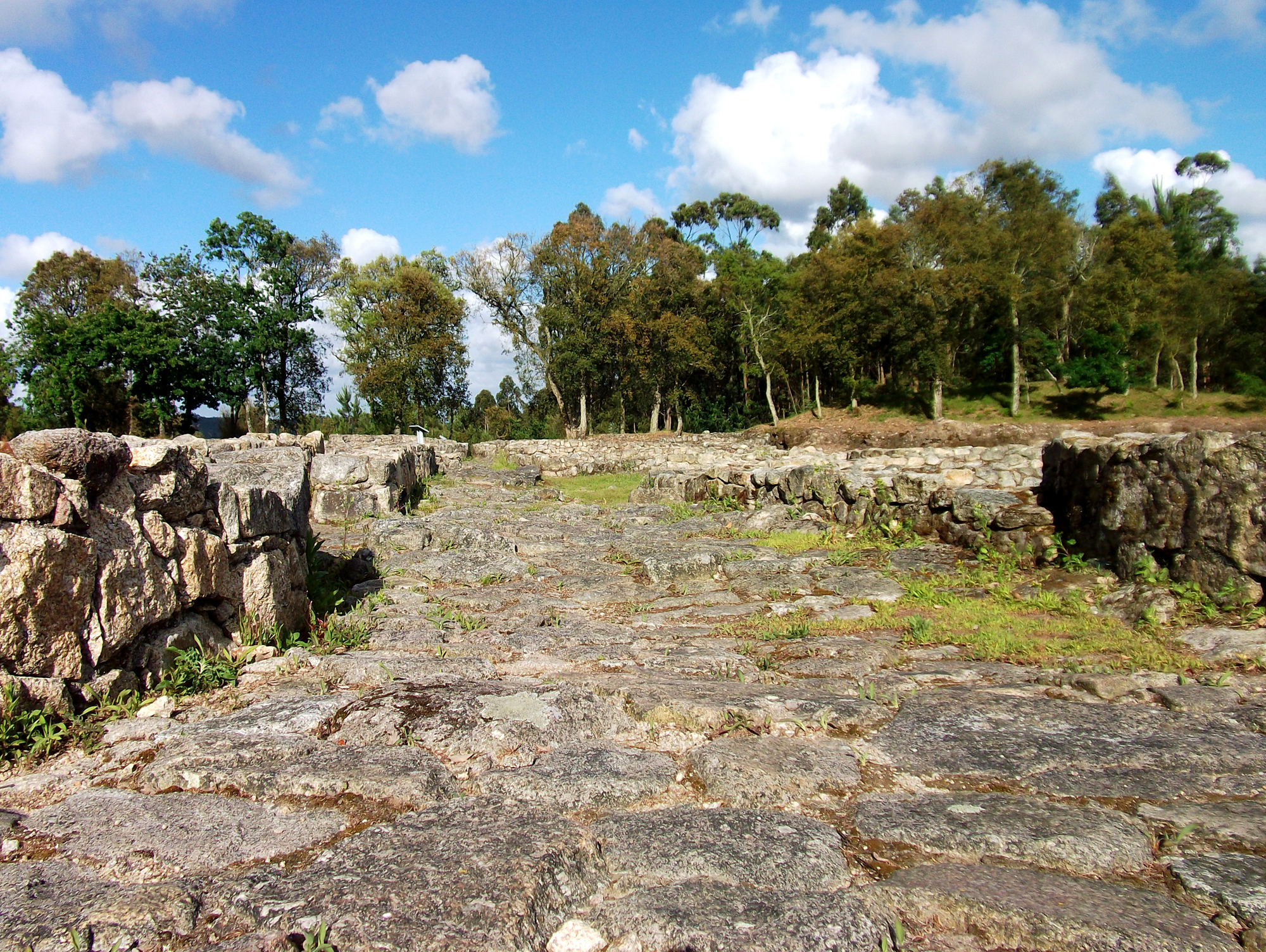
Preserved Decumanus street. The first granite buildings appeared in the 5th century B.C. The city developed with new technology and trade brought in by the Mediterranean cultures.

Widespread pillaging by rival tribes led the resident populations of the coastal plain of Póvoa de Varzim to raise a fortified town atop the hill that stood next to the sea. The city area covered 12,000 m^{2} (3.0 acres) and had several hundred inhabitants. The City prospered due to its strong defensive walls and its location near the ocean, which facilitated trade with the maritime civilizations of the Mediterranean Sea, especially during the Carthaginian dominion of the southern Iberian Peninsula.

The city had some urbanization stages: during the first centuries, the small habitations were constructed with adobe mixed with vegetable additive. The first constructions made out of rock started to appear in the 5th century B.C., due to iron peaks technology that appeared in Asia Minor, brought to the Iberian Peninsula by Phoenician settlers in the Atlantic Coast during the 8th and 7th centuries B.C.

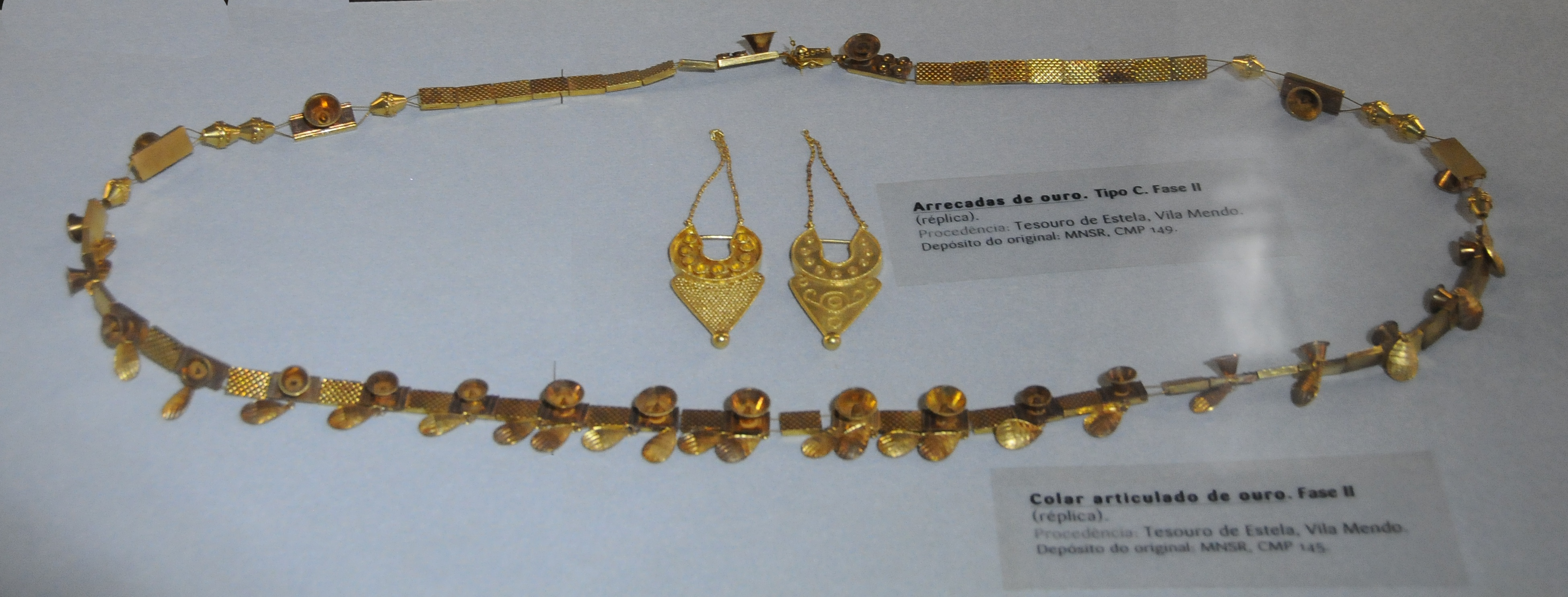
Castro culture jewelry. Villa Mendo Treasure, similar to another one found in a clay pot in São Félix Hill from probable funerary ritual. Replica, depository of original: MNSR.

The visits of Phoenicians, Carthaginians, Greeks, and Romans had as purpose the exchange of textiles and wine for gold and tin, despite the scarcity of terrestrial ways, this was not a problem for Cividade de Terroso that was strategically located next to the sea and by the Ave River, thus an extensive trade existed in the city. The external commerce, dominated by tin, was complemented with domestic trade in tribal markets between the different cities and villages of the Castro culture, they exchanged textiles, metals (gold, copper, tin and lead) and handicrafts including exotic products, such as glass or exotic ceramics, brought from trading with the peoples of the Mediterranean or other areas of the Peninsula.

The population worked in agriculture, fishing, gathering, shepherding and worked metals, textiles and ceramics. Cultural influences arrived from inland Iberian Peninsula, beyond the ones proceeding from the Mediterranean through trade.

In the area of the modern city, ceramics surfaced during a highway construction in 1998 and walls were detected in 2002, the site may have been a Castro culture farmhouse.

== Roman conquest and Establishment of Varzim 138 B.C.–411 ==
=== Resistance and Roman conquest ===
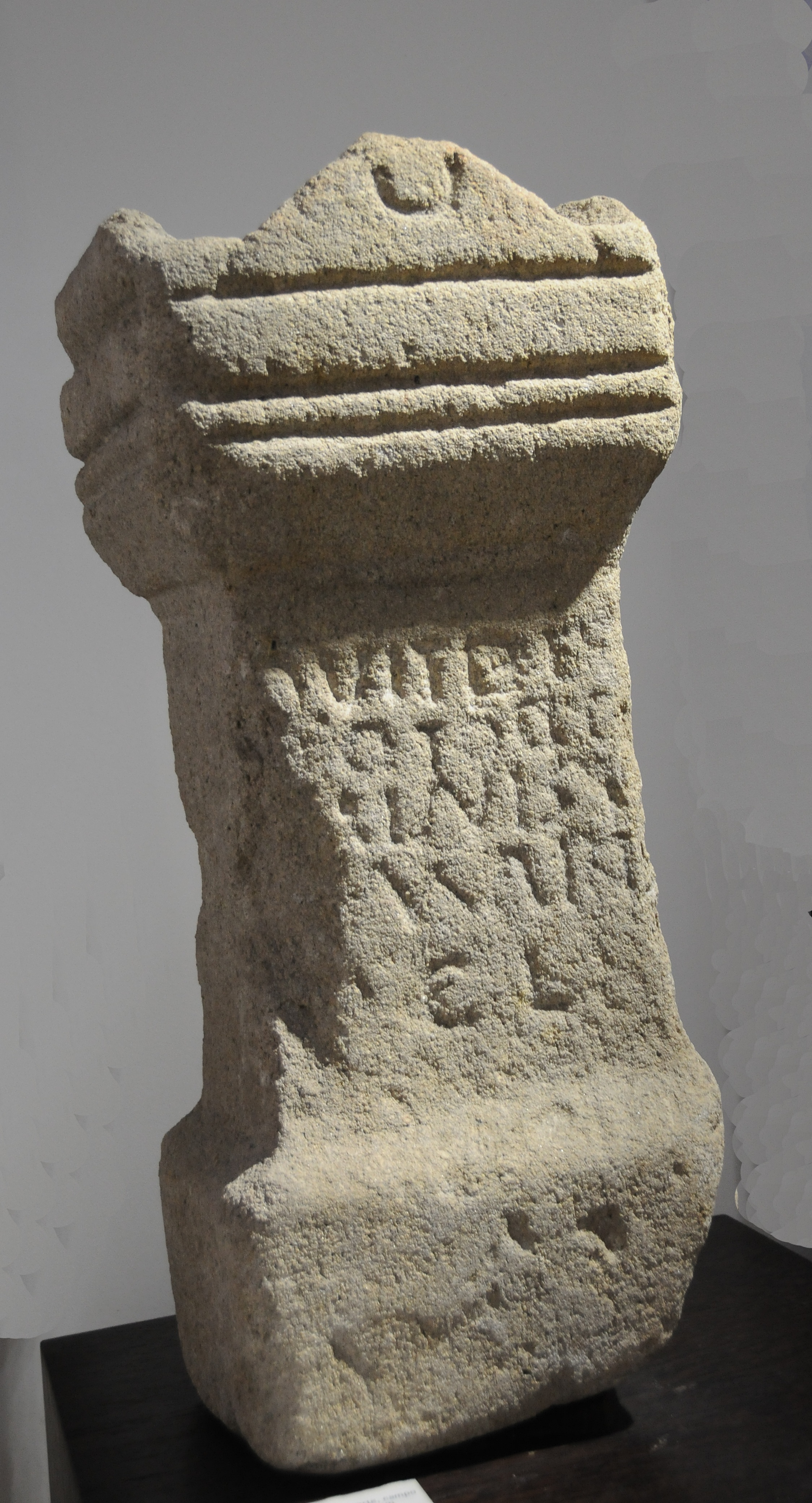
Stele dedicated to the popular god Mars. Mars was identified with Cosus, the prominent pre-Roman god in coastal Castro region.

During the Punic Wars, the Romans became aware of the Castro region's rich deposits of gold and tin. Viriathus, leading Lusitanian troops, hindered the expansion of the Roman Republic north of the river Douro. His murder in 138 BC opened the way for the Roman legions. Over the following two years, Decimus Junius Brutus advanced into the Castro region from south of the Douro, crushed the tribal armies, and left Cividade de Terroso in ruins, by burning the city to the ground. A celebrated milestone refers that Brutus victories extended to the ocean.

Appian mentioned two battles led by Brutus, in which women fought alongside the men and both ended in Roman victory. Archaeological data in the site and tribesmen's Last stand behavior, highlight the barbarity of the conquest.

=== Brutus settlements ===
Proclaimed Roman mercy comes throw the establishment of Brutus's peaceful settlements. Soon after the conquest and under Roman reform, the Cividade was rebuilt. In the shoreline, Villa Euracini and fish factories were constructed. The Castro people returned to the coastal plain and a gradual abandonment of the hill started as the region was pacified under Caesar Augustus's Pax Romana. In time, Villa Euracini would evolve to Póvoa de Varzim.

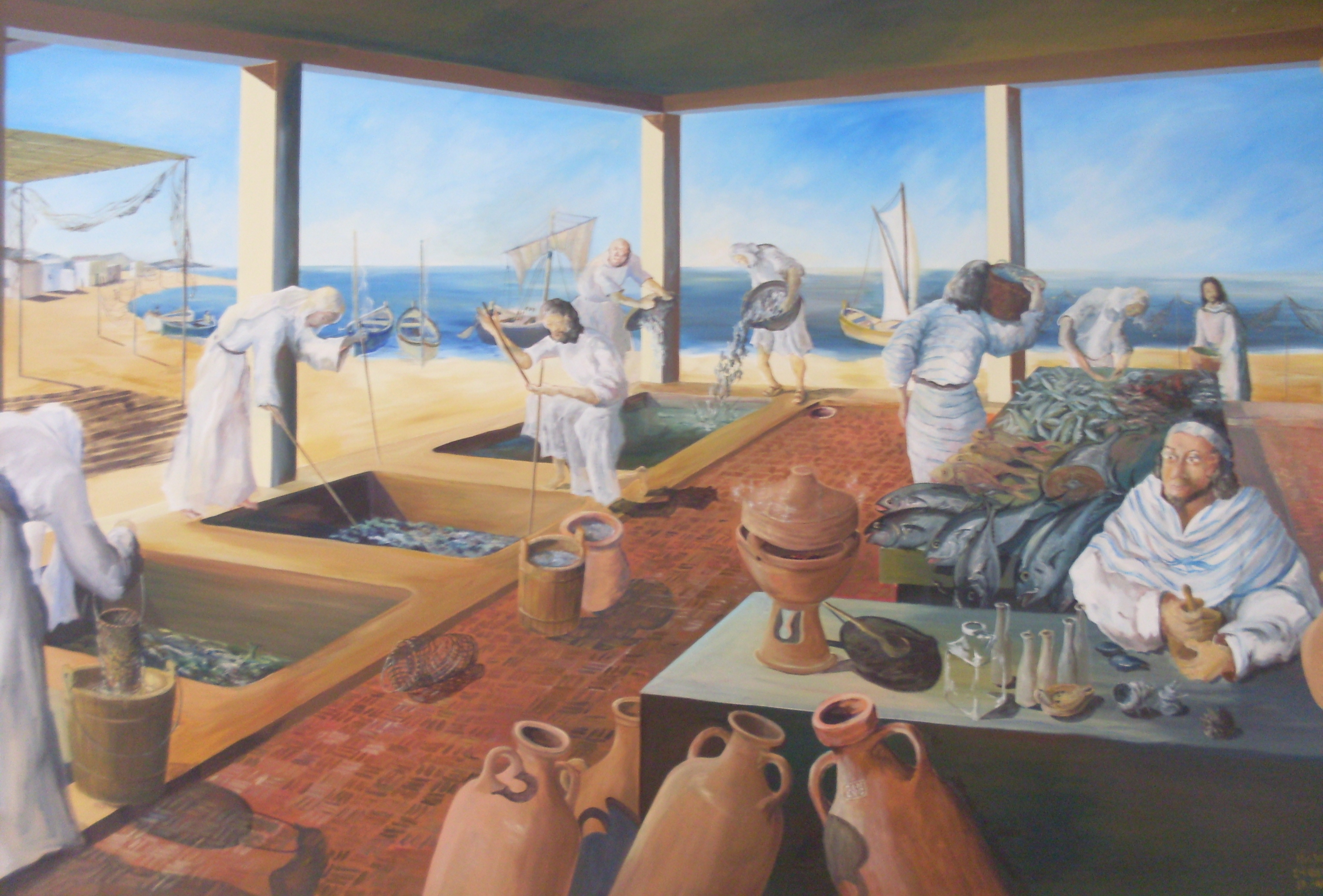
Representation of a Roman fish factory.

Around Villa Euracini's natural harbors, the fish industry developed. The cetariæ, a Roman fish factory was built for the production of garum, a fish sauce condiment. The factory had 2,40 m wide and deep tanks near the seashore, surrounded by houses, one of which probably dating to the 1st century and more recent buildings. A waterfront Roman road linked the area to Foz do Douro, to the south, and Caminha to the north. Another fish processing factory and salt evaporation ponds existed in Junqueira, near the core of Villa Euracini, where remains of buildings and a number of artifacts, including vases were found. These ruins could be older than those found in Alto de Martim Vaz. In the Old town of Póvoa de Varzim, the probable core of Roman Villa Euracini, vestiges of buildings, called aedificia, and ceramics also surfaced.

Aqualata, A Roman mining complex, was created at the steps of São Félix Hill, just north of Cividade de Terroso. The site is preserved as a small lake known as Lagoa Negra, the Black Lake. Before the Roman conquest, it is thought that the tribesmen also mined it, and the notorious Castro culture jewelry found scattered in Póvoa de Varzim is stated to have been mined there. These mines were intensively exploited during the Roman period and may have been the reason why the Via Veteris, a Roman road, crossed the coastal area.

Cape Santo André, a religious site, is the ancient Roman Auarius Promontorium referred by Ptolemy and with visible Romanization, the importance of the site, possibly, predated the Roman period. Archaeological data indicate the existence of a necropolis dating from the Roman period in the area of Giesteira. Remains of this necropolis were also found in the nearby area of Paredes, including Roman tegula.

A legendary foundation of Póvoa de Varzim stated that the town was established by a Roman consul named Cayo Varzinio (Caius Varzinius), giving his name to the town. This myth appeared by the 19th century and promptly disputed by researchers in the 19th and early 20th century.

== Barbarian, Moor and Norse invasions 411–1033 ==
=== Germanic settlements and the arrival of the Moors ===
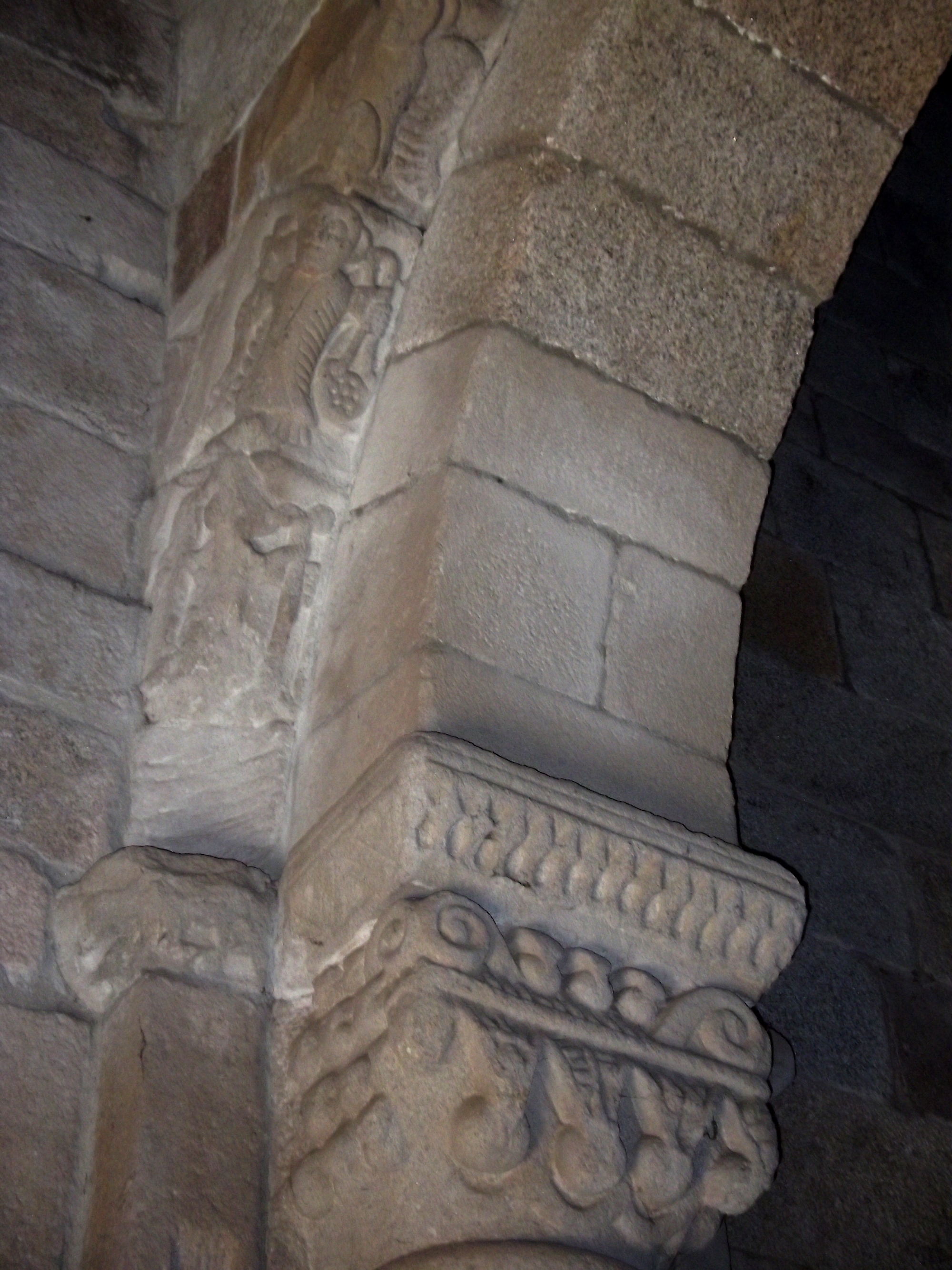
11th/12th century art in the Monastery of Rates. A 1st century Roman stele Christianized around the 4th or 5th century could show hints of the Suebic period.

With the fall of the Roman Empire, Suebi populations established themselves in the region. City quarters and former hamlets around Villa Euracini suggest Germanic naming, such as Regufe (from Rekaufus, rek- + wulf, 'wolf'), Argivai (from Argivadi) and Gresufes (from Grisulfus, possibly Gothic *gris- 'horror' and wulfs, 'wolf'). It was also believed that Varzim itself, due to its Germanic influence, started as a Germanic settlement, until archaeological finds expanded the settlement to the Roman period. The Germanic people were obliged to settle mostly in rural areas. Idacius (c. 400 – c. 469) is very explicit in this "the Hispanic, spread around the cities and oppida..." and the "Barbarians, rule over the provinces..." (HYDACE: I, § 49, pp. 117–119).

The Suebic kingdom of Gallaecia was incorporated as a province into the Visigothic one in 585. After the Moorish conquest of Hispania, since 711, the region maintained a significant share of its population, in a social and political area where there was no acting state powers. This Christian region that kept the structure of the Roman and Roman-Germanic past was reorganized as the County of Portugal, a government in the Kingdom of Galicia (Kingdom of Asturias), later known as Kingdom of León.

=== The Viking raids ===
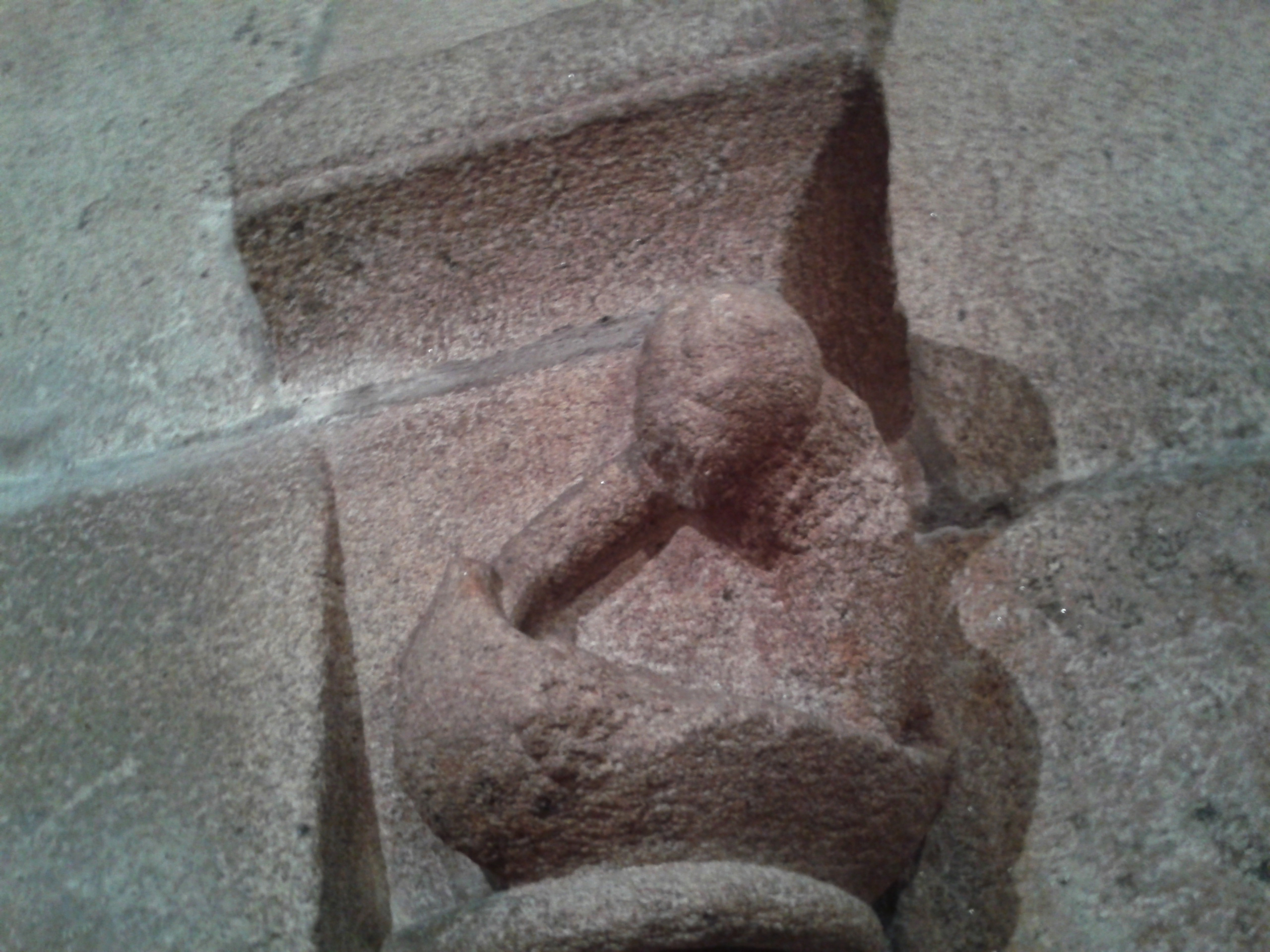
Boat identified as Norman sculpted in the church of Rio Mau Monastery.

The first Norman incursion occurred in 844 by a group of Danish Vikings, who after being defeated near the Tower of Hercules, looted all the coast reaching the south of the peninsula, then under Moorish rule, they returned north and vanished after passing by Faro, Beja, and Lisbon. According to Ibn Hayyan and other sources, they returned to Gallaecia and eventually settled there. A second huge attack, with plundering all over the coast, occurred in 859. Due to pillaging and the destruction of everything they found, the Vikings were seen as a worse threat to Hispania than the Moors.

Póvoa de Varzim was first mentioned on March 26, 953 during the rule of Mumadona Dias, Countess of Portugal between 924 and around 950. The countess ordered the construction of the Guimarães Castle in order to protect a Monastery against attacks by the "gentiles", reporting to the Normans, the Vikings. Instigated by the Duke of Normandy, there is a powerful incursion in 968 using a fleet of 100 ships led by the Viking Gundered (Gudrød), considered by them as the King of the Sea (sækonungr in old Norse). They landed in a seaport named Juncariae and from there they went to Iria Flavia, destroying hamlets and villages. They kept in there for a year, when their petty king and a good share of the attackers fell against the army led by the Galician count Gonçalo Sanches in 970.

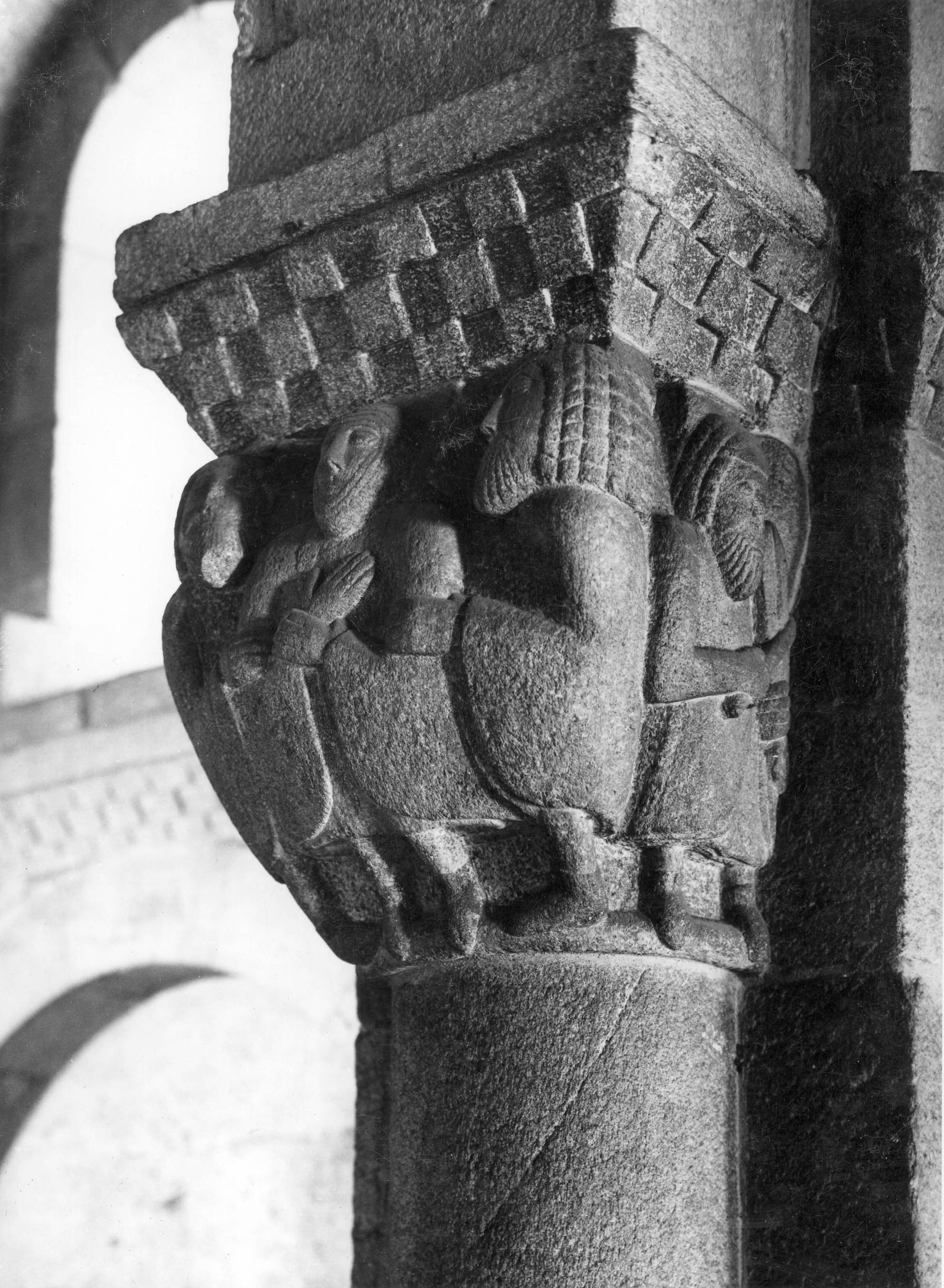
Capital depicting warriors in the monastic church of Rio Mau (1151) in the Lordship of Varzim.

The Normans attacked again in 984, 1016, 1018 and 1050. Various chronicles and documents suggest an incursion in Entre-Douro-e-Minho in 1008, which may have provoked the death of the Portuguese count, Mendo Gonçalves.

In the Norman incursion of 1015–1016, the Monastery of Vairão was sacked. Located in the South of the Ave River, the monastery hold and recorded events in the region since 921. In 1016, inland Vermoim Castle suffered a bloody assault, by Norman pirates, in which the Portuguese count Alvito Nunes was killed. In Póvoa de Varzim their incursions went from the coast to the Este River, and the Ave River established as the south limit. Various hints indicate a Norse settlement in Villa Euracini after those invasions came to an end. During the Middle Ages, the name Euracini evolved to Uracini, Vracini, Veracini, Verazini, Verazim, and eventually Varazim.

=== Clash of civilizations and the border lordships ===
Arriving from the south, in 997, the region was probably sacked by the Moorish troops of Al-mansur, after his conquest of the Aguiar de Sousa Castle in 995, the Christian realms suffered a setback and a new border with the short-lived Caliphate of Córdoba (929 – 1031) is drawn at the Douro River, creating political chaos, the weakening of the County's power, the expansion of power of the feudal lordships of the region and transformations, before and after the attack, that questioned the authority of the Kingdom of León, especially after the reign of Alfonso V and Bermudo III of Leon.

In the frontline against the Moorish-dominated lands were the lordships of Maia (bordering the Lordship of Varzim across the Ave river), Sousa, Baião, and Ribadouro whom solidified their power between the Ave and the Douro. The Lords of Sousa and Ribadouro lead the independence of Portugal from external subordination since the government of countess Mumadoma Dias up to the establishment of the kingdom of Portugal.

== Feudalism and municipalism 1033–1318 ==
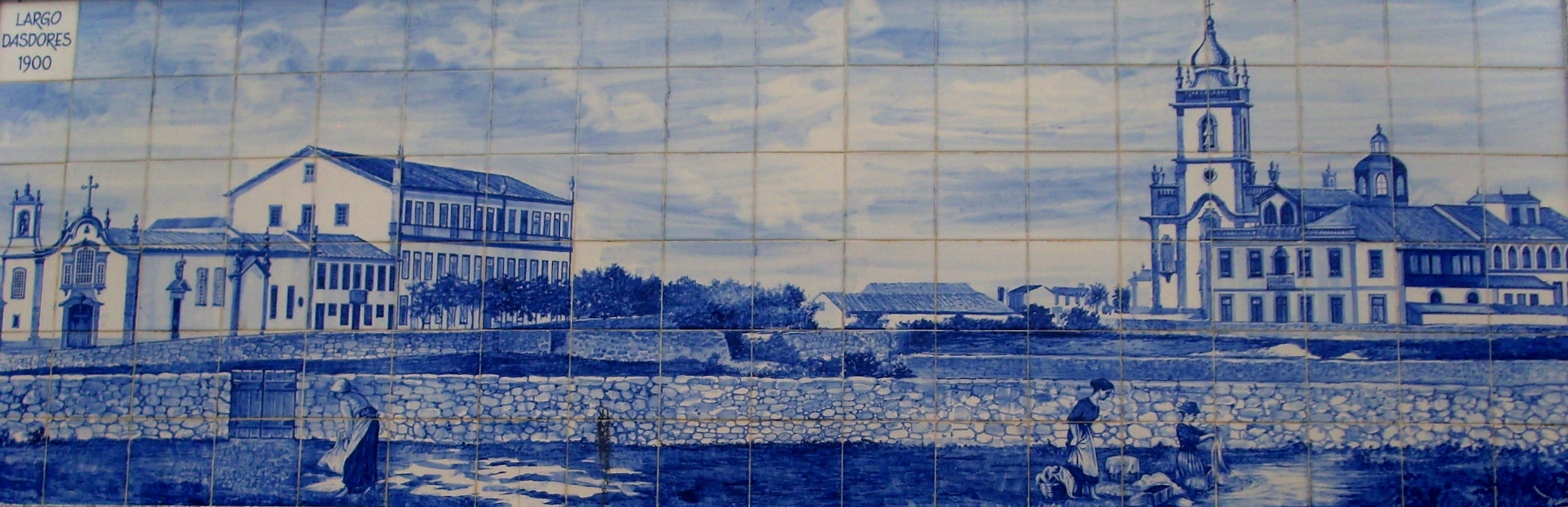
The old main Church, temple to the left, was built around the 11th century in Dores Square in the Old Town of Varzim.

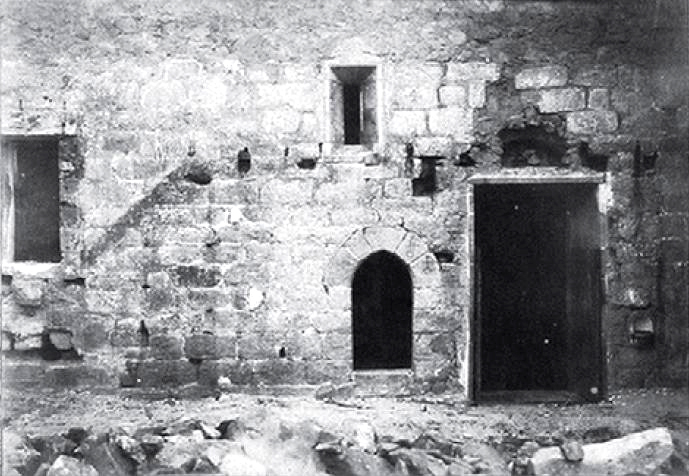
The main church being demolished in 1910 for urbanistic reasons, as it was thought not to be significant due to historical adulteration. It then became clear it was of medieval foundation, dating to the height of Varzim's feudal period. The old stones were reused to build a new nearby church, while the Romano-Gothic arch is preserved in the city's museum.

=== Lordship of Varzim ===
In the 11th century, Guterre Pelayo, said to have been born in Gascony, come from France with count Henry and became the Lord of Varzim. According to the Livro Velho de Linhagens, the ancient book of nobility compiled by 1270, he got from the count the port of Varzim amongst several other possessions. Guterre and his son, Payo Guterres, were decisive captains during the Reconquista. This grant is contested by the reputable Medievalist Almeida Fernandes who claimed that the grant is older, from 1033, and the fief was granted to another Guterre Pelayo, an ancestor of those, by Bermudo III, the Emperor in Gallaecia and reigning from São João de Rei, in Póvoa de Lanhoso, Portugal. Ancient sources also claimed that Guterre Pelayo was the third grandson of Fruela II of León.

According to documents from 1198, 1203, and 1206, Póvoa de Varzim, then named Villa Verazin (Town of Varzim), was a powerful fiefdom with a territory extending from the coast to the Cividade de Terroso and Lanudos hills in the lands of Bracara.

One of the great-grandsons of the later Guterre Pelayo, Lourenço Fernandes da Cunha was one of the knights that in 1176, with Prince Sancho, attacked Seville, an Islamic city in the south of the Peninsula, returning with good spoils of war. He had great wealth in Villa Verazim and bought several houses and lands in town, including half of one property near his palace and inherited 16 properties in Varzim, 7.5 in Cunha and some others around the kingdom from his relative Gonçalo Ramires. In the area of Veracim dos Cavaleyros (Knights' Varzim), that was the core of the knights honor, he stated he had two palaces for his sons and grandsons.

=== Ravages and seized lands ===
Sancho, as king of Portugal, disliked the power Dom Lourenço got, whose dominions was located not only in Varzim and Cunha, but expanded throw several lands in the kingdom and his family conspired against the king, as such the king ordered the destruction of several of his properties, including 10 of the 17 properties of Varzim and his tower in Cunha. The king took over the land, destroyed the properties and expelled the farmers.

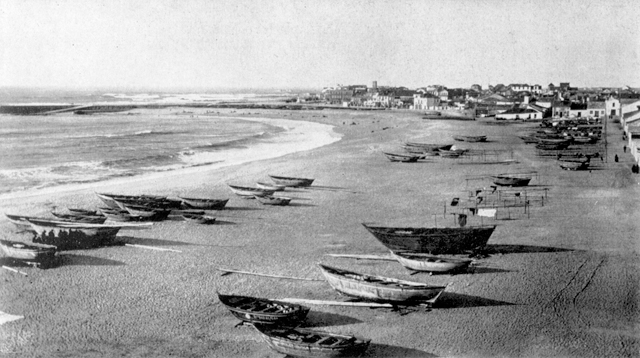
Fierce disputes between the early Portuguese kings and the local overlords over the Port of Varzim and the town's lands lead to ravages and the establishment of the municipality in 1308.

In the 1220 inquiries, in the established Royal Land of Varzim or Lower Varzim, a royal butler area, there were 20 families, who gave to the king, when he came into town, 6 dinheiros for the stay; and by royal charter, if they did not go to the sea on Friday, they paid 5 mealhas (small copper coin with little value); and paid from the fisheries, the navão (one fish for each boat). Those who were not fishermen, gave 2 soldos to the king once a year. Knights Varzim had properties of the Knights Hospitaller, who inherited the wealth of the local overlords, and properties from religious orders, mostly from the monasteries of S. Cristovão de Rio Mau and S. Simão da Junqueira, founded by Payo Guterres, grandfather of Dom Lourenço. There were 81.5 properties in the Royal Land, Argivai and Giesteira alone, 51 were owned by the king, 25.5 by the military and religious orders, 5 belonged to the church and one, Quintela, was privately owned.

During the reign of Sancho II of Portugal, and while the king was disputing the throne with his brother, Afonso, who was invited by the knights to take over the Portuguese throne, Gavião of Varzim used the opportunity to destroy the king's assets in Lower Varzim. According to a 1258 chronic, he entered in the king's property, in a violent way, which was several times built and improved, destroying it significantly in such a way that no bread could be sowed, nor a car could cross that place as it often used to do. The knight left throw Boído Lagoon, currently Praça do Almada, the border with Knights Varzim. The damage was so significant that when Sancho II was overthrown and Afonso became the King of Portugal he ordered the Judge of Faria, Martinho Martins, to resettle the royal land, only managed to get settlers for 15 of the 20 farming properties, as these feared the knights. The king's chronicler explicitly stated that all of the port of Varzim was property of Lord the King.

=== Municipality established ===
One of the sons of Dom Lourenço was Gomes Lourenço, very influential knight and godfather of King Denis. Dom Gomes, as it is deduced from his personal 1290 Inquiries, took advantage of his relationship with important people in order to get the recognition of the seaport of Varzim, located in Royal Land of Varzim, as his honor. He tried to convince King Denis, that the King's father, Afonso III, took it from him unfairly. In this way, Gomes and his descendants, who are part of the honor of Varzim (honrra de Veracim), went to the seaport and got the navão from the fishermen, justifying the attitude with the honor. Prior to that, Gomes and King Denis had disputes resolved in favor of the King by the ecclesiastical court of Braga in 1285.

In 1308, King Denis granted a charter (known in Portugal as a Foral), giving the royal land to 54 families of Varzim;. these had to establish a medieval settlement known as Póvoa in the Royal land, the inhabitants should group as neighbors of this municipality, with the election of a judge, a community tax of 250 pounds and with seaport rights. Some of the name of the 54 family patriarchs are still today surnames in the fisher community. Of those 54 families, 42 worked in fisheries and the remaining 12 were farmers. Despite the taxes being reasonably high, the charter granted autonomy to the community, avoiding being subject to feudal domain and the royal butler, leading to the development of the town.

A foral's clause stated that the settlers, that docked barges and boats, with bread, wine, salt or sardines unloaded in the seaport of Póvoa de Varzim, should give for each barge or boat, 7 soldos. These were the customs rights that belonged to the King and substituted the navão.

== Monastic domain 1318–1514 ==
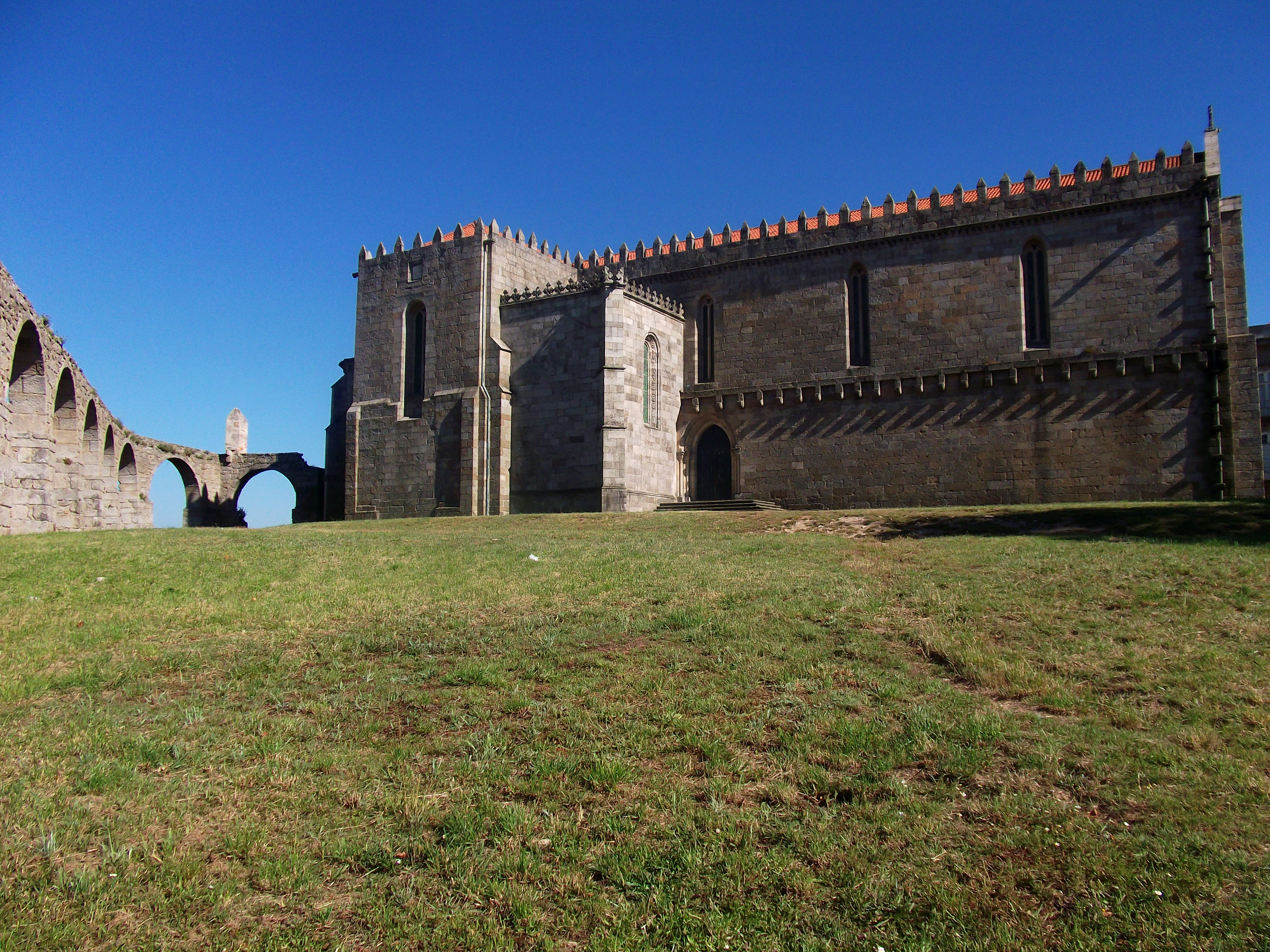
The abbesses of Santa Clara Monastery taxed Póvoa between 1319 and 1514 and tense relations with the town arose.

In 1312, King Denis donated the town to his bastard son, Afonso Sanches, Lord of Albuquerque, who included it in the patrimony of the Convent of Santa Clara in 1318, which he had just founded in Vila do Conde. Afonso Sanches stated that he gave «Our villas and hamlets that are known as Povoa de Varzim, and all our large farms of Touginha and Veerjz and the ones in Tarroso, Formarjz, Landõo, Nabaaes and Miranei, with families and large farms (...). But we retain for us and the ones that will come after us the justice and appeals of Varzim». Póvoa was then in the jurisdictional dependency of the monastery, excepting in the appealing processes.

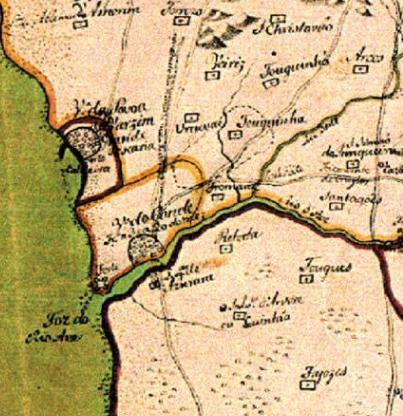
Ancient map of the towns of Póvoa de Varzim and Vila do Conde. The Port of Póvoa de Varzim is also represented.

King Afonso IV in his 1343 inquiries wanted to know the wealth of the religious orders. The abbess of the monastery presented a big letter in which it is stated, in Latin, that King Denis gave, to Afonso Sanches, Lower Varzim, and its royal charter valuing 250 pounds were property of the monastery. The abbess would have no rights over Upper Varzim (or Knights' Varzim), of the Order of Malta, nor the families of the king. Certain scholars noted that the donation could be from 1305, thus prior to the royal charter.

In 1367, King Ferdinand I confirmed the charters, privileges and uses of Póvoa de Varzim. These were again confirmed by John I in 1387. Five year earlier, the same king confirmed the jurisdiction of the Count of Neiva over Póvoa, the attribution date is unknown. However, by the royal charter of February 17, 1466, it was determined by King Afonso V that no powerful person could enter in the neighboring towns of Póvoa de Varzim and Vila do Conde.

The domain of the monastery grew stronger over the town of Póvoa de Varzim, and harmful to Povoans. When the Knight's over-lordship ended, the abbess took the initiative to send an ouvidor (listener) to confirm the Povoan judge, to judge the appeals, and taking the customs taxes, but only wanted 4$000 réis of the 5$000 rs. that the town hall had to pay according to the royal charter. Tense relations with the monastery developed and Povoans repetitively asked King Manuel I to end the situation and being incorporated in the crown. On the other hand, the abbesses were supported by influential families, the fishermen spontaneously offered soles to the abbesses when they fished it and the people willingly took the icon of Our Lady of Varzim in a procession to the monastery, as the Lady of Varzim was popular in several parishes.

In 1514, King Manuel I gave a new charter to Póvoa de Varzim, in which the financial part of the ancient royal charter was changed and created new mechanisms for the jurisdiction of the monastery. In 1517, the monastery was reformed by the friar Francisco Lisboa, nominated by papal bull in 1515, according to requests by king Manuel I. The Abbess Joana de Meneses resisted and was obliged to move to another convent. Besides the town hall and public square, the town also got a pillory, and involved itself in the Portuguese discoveries. The pillory had the armillary sphere of King Manuel I, a symbol of the discoveries. In 1537, Póvoa de Varzim was incorporated in the Crown, and grouped in comarca do Porto, a shire, getting with this event full autonomy.

== Shipbuilders and seafarers 1514–1707 ==
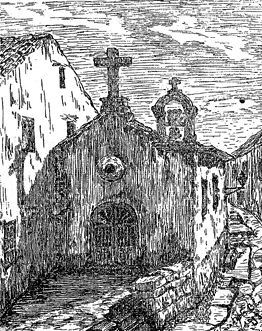
The popularity of Madre de Deus Chapel was used to recruit men for seafaring activities.

=== Famed shipbuilders and seamen ===
In the 16th century, the fishermen started to work in maritime activities, as pilots or seafarers in the crew of the Portuguese ships, due to their high nautical knowledge.

The fishermen of the region are known to fish in Newfoundland since, at least, 1506. During this period, the main professions were farmer, seafarer, sailor, pilot, carpenter and Ribeira carpenter (shipbuilder). During the reign of John III the Povoan shipmaking art was already renowned, and Povoan carpenters were sought after by Lisbon's Ribeira das Naus shipyard due to their high technical skills.

The single floored houses dominated the town's landscape, but there are indications of multiple floored habitations with rich architecture. The seafarers' social class, well-off gentlemen, is associated with this richer architecture such as Amador Alvares, a pilot of the route of India, or pilots Pedro Fernandes, Diogo Pyz de São Pedro, Lourenço Dias among others. This bourgeoisie was the great owner of most real estate around Praça Velha square, that the population saw as the urban area.

There was a chapel around Praça Velha, known as Madre de Deus chapel, built before 1521 by the nobleman João Gomes Gaio, father of the knight João Martins Gaio, the later was part of the maritime trade of Vila do Conde. The chapel became the most popular temple in town. And by being established in Póvoa civic center he could easily recruit men for seafaring activities. This noble family was responsible for the benefits Póvoa gained during this period.

Notable Povoan seafarers getting their wealth during this period includes António Gonçalves in the Route of Brazil, Diogo Pires de São Pedro in the Route of Angola, António Luís in the Route of India. However, some seafarers birthplace is not possible to be determined due to lack of records, some could only be associated with the town throw their surnames, nicknames or death records. Gomes Martins de Faria, mostly known as Gomes Martins da Póvoa, was the owner and captain of an 80-tuns carrack of the Route of São Tomé, which became a warship in order to defend from French corsairs, he gained significant wealth and founded São Sebastião Chapel (c.1582) in Póvoa de Varzim, and became the ordinary judge (mayor) in 1584 and 1587. Diogo Dias de São Pedro, mayor in 1599, was the captain of the warship N.S.Guadalupe, built in the Port of Póvoa de Varzim, in order to recapture Pernambuco from the Dutch. António Cardia, captain-major of the Portuguese armada, who recaptured Bahia from the Dutch in 1624. One of the oldest streets in Póvoa bears the name of Amadinha to this day, which according to the local legend, was a black slave woman loved by a marine captain, who when he died left all his wealth to her.

In the 16th century registries, the year 1559 represented a peak in seafarers deaths. Most occurred in the Route of the Antilles, in the West Indies. Other routes common to the Povoan seafarers included São Tomé, Flanders, the islands, Lisbon, and Alicante. At the turn of the 17th century, with the union with Castile, most deaths were concentrated in the West Indies, Seville, Peru, and the Indies. The Spanish kings favored the free movement of the people and Seville got filled with Portuguese, some of whom Povoans, to such an extent that the Portuguese language, in some streets, was more common than Castilian, and other lands of the New World, such as the Gulf of Mexico, were open to the Portuguese merchants.

=== Shipbuilding boom and urban expansion ===
In the 17th century, the shipbuilding industry boomed in Ribeira shipyard, area around Póvoa fortress in the sheltered bay, and one-third of the population had some relation with this activity, building ships for the merchant navigation. The carpenter profession became the main one and was followed by the fishermen and farmers. in the end of the century, gold is discovered in Brazil, which led to an increase in emigration to these new lands.

Until the 17th century, fisheries were not very developed. Then the brine preservation business transformed Póvoa into the biggest fish market in northern Portugal, supplying even the inland provinces.

The 17th century was important for the organization of Póvoa de Varzim. On the civil level there was the electoral reform of 1612, the fiscal reform of 1656 with the Foral de Sisas, the annexation of Aver-o-Mar, and the dispute with the house of Braganza due to the town's borders. During this period there was a relevant urban expansion: the Praça civic center with the town hall and the Madre Deus Chapel, the area of the old town (Vila Velha) where the Main church was located and the fishermen neighborhood of Junqueira was starting its affirmation as a new urban center. At religious level, associations of religious character started appearing, the institution of the Holly Week celebrations and the enlargement of the Main Church, located in the old town's Lugar da Mata.

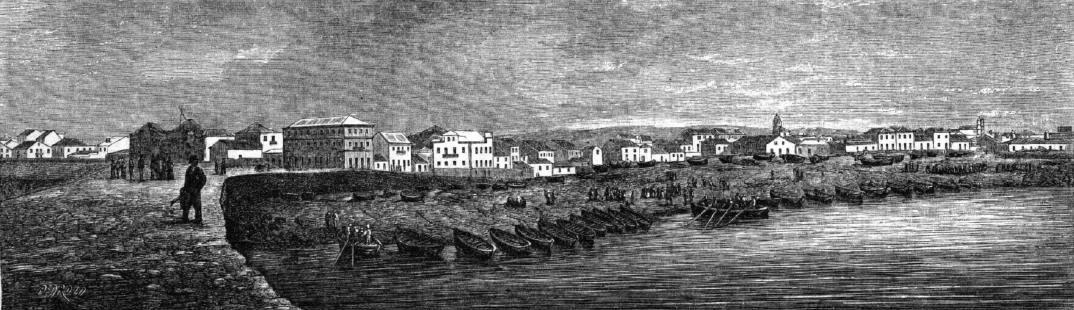
Ribeira shipyard in the Port of Póvoa de Varzim, was where the shipbuilding and fisher activities developed.

=== Territorial disputes with the House of Braganza ===
The town limit between the town of Póvoa de Varzim and the county of Barcelos (controlled by the House of Braganza) was a dispute which started in the 16th century. The border of the county of Barcelos entered the urban area of Póvoa de Varzim. In the royal charters, by King Denis and confirmed by King Manuel I, Póvoa had town limit exception and the right of appeal to the Crown, what were seen as significant privileges.

The town limit exception became an issue when Póvoa was annexed to Comarca do Porto in the middle of the 16th century, becoming a municipal enclave in Minho province surrounded by lands of the House of Braganza. The Northern and Eastern border with Barcelos were the reason for most of the disputes, as these were areas already significantly settled, especially Gândara and the Old Town of Póvoa de Varzim. As such, Póvoa de Varzim considered that its territory was that of medieval Villa Euracini (Town of Varzim).

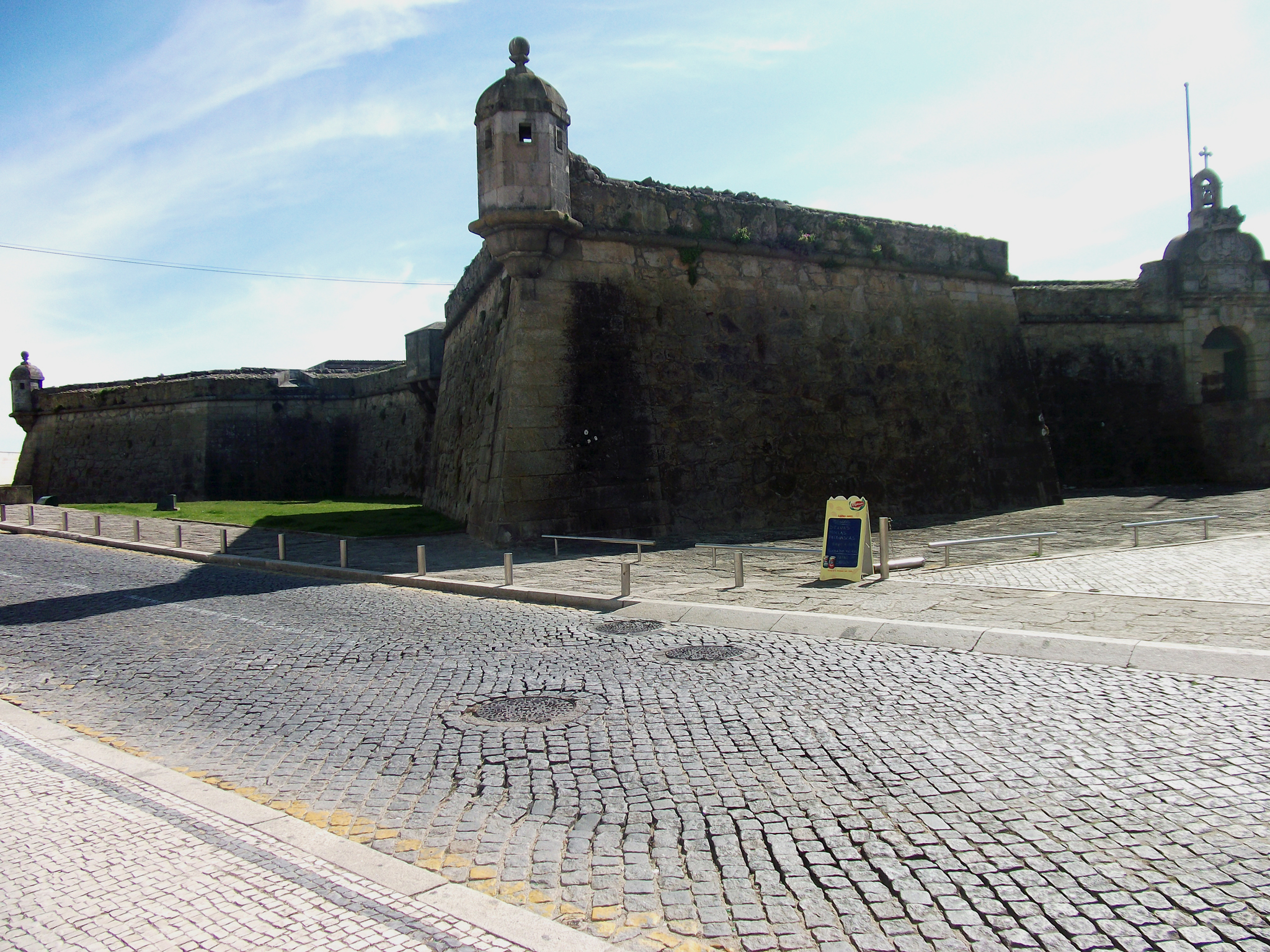
During the age of gunpowder, Castelo da Póvoa was fully rebuilt due to privateer attacks.

In medieval documents, preserved by the Monastery of Vairão, it was stated that Varzim stretched from the sea to Cividade Hill (subtus mons Civitas Terroso), the São Félix Hill (subtus mons Lanudos), the Este river and further. The expression "subtus mons", characteristic in the Portuguese medieval documents, was proved by Ferreira de Almeida that it is an administrative and military dependency. The Honour of Varzim included estates in areas such as Argivai, Laundos, Terroso, and Rio Mau.

According to Barcelos, that considered itself to have primacy in the region, only Lower Varzim, the Royal land, was part of the municipality of Póvoa de Varzim. Lower Varzim was the south of Póvoa de Varzim Parish. However, the parish was not of the same size as the fiscal area. The Our Lady of Varzim Church located in the old town, which became the fish church of the vicarship, was outside of those borders. The Town Hall of Póvoa de Varzim also got from the Braga chapter house the "Judge of the Church" rights extending its jurisdiction in areas outside the civil border. In Póvoa de Varzim's Corpus Christi procession, the clergymen of several parishes were obliged to participate since 1591 by the archbishop. In 1694, the border dispute between the town halls of Póvoa de Varzim and Barcelos reached a climax and is taken to court.

In 1707, by royal decree, the Corregedor Gaspar Cardoso marked the boundaries of the town of Póvoa de Varzim, expanding it to the north and east (from then on including the suburbs of the Old town, Alto de Martim Vaz, Barreiros, and Gândara and the demarcation of the House of Braganza was considered invalid for these areas.

== The golden age of fishing 1707–1892 ==
=== Preeminent fishermen and urban renewal ===
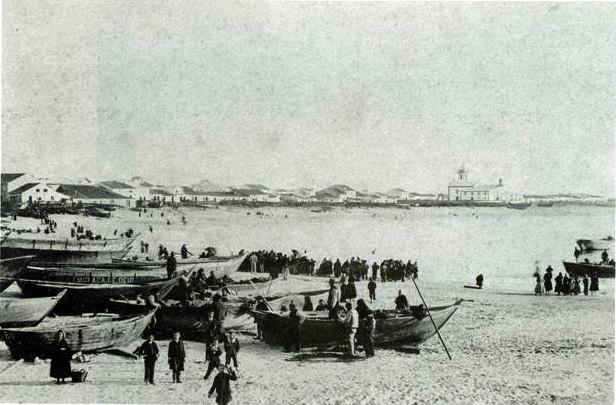
View of the sheltered bay and the Fisher quarter in c.1836 with the Lapa Lighthouse and church visible in the background.

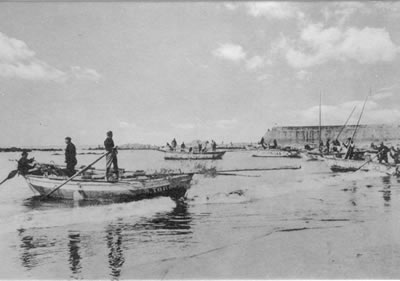
Fishing boats in the port.

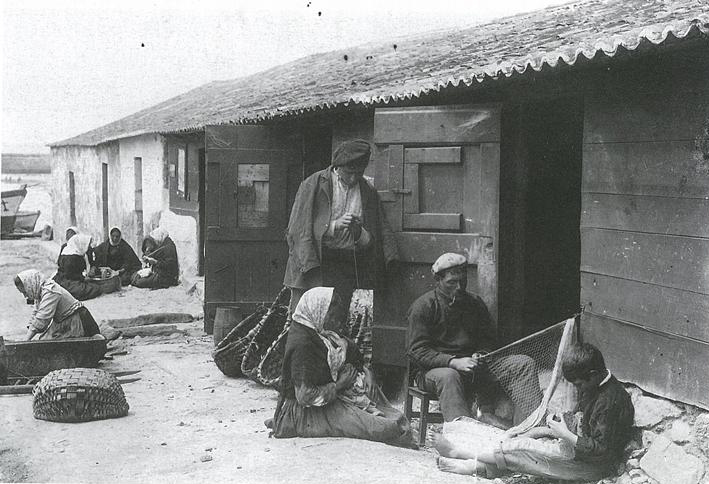
Fishermen's living conditions. circa 1900 to 1915.

In the beginning of the 18th century, there is a decline in the Ribeira shipyard activities, due to the aggradation of the Portuguese coast and the Povoan shipyard started to work in the construction of fishing vessels. There was a significant increase of the fisher community in the middle of the century, becoming the main activity, and during the reign of Joseph I with the country in the middle of an economic crisis, Póvoa started a rapid development. This development was due to the fisher activities originated, mostly, from protectionist laws by the kingdoms of Portugal and Spain. The fish that supplied the national market was, since the 16th century, imported from Galicia.

It is during this period that several churches were built and the Santa Casa da Misericórdia was created. The Nossa Senhora da Lapa Brotherhood, founded in 1761 by the fishermen, got a charter in which they got authorization to build their homes in "chãos da areia", giving rise to a new and planned fisher quarter.

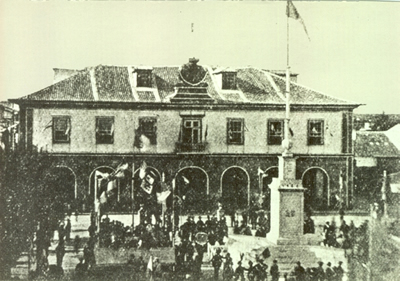
City Hall in the mid-19th century.

In the Memorias economicas da Academia real das sciencias de Lisboa (Economic memories of the Royal Academy of Sciences of Lisbon) it states that the fishermen of Póvoa de Varzim are the most attendable of all the Minho coast, and were the most experts and with most practice from Cape St. Vincent to Caminha, with a sizable number of fishermen, ships and fishing devices, and the result is a very considerable quantity of caught fish, stating that "The fishermen of Póvoa de Varzim are always at sea, they are not happy with coastal fisheries, and they get fish from seas, that are ten or twelve leagues away from the town." In 1789, there were 1340 fishermen. Póvoa had 900 houses, mostly of fishermen and the few remaining were mechanical jobs.

The corregedor Almada, by the royal provision of 1791 by Queen Maria I, restructured the urbanization of Póvoa de Varzim, creating the New Square where a new monumental city hall was built, the Coelheiro Aqueduct was raised to supply freshwater to the civic center, the Casas da Cadeia, Rio Novo, and Rua Nova das Trempes were built. Queen Maria I also turned Póvoa into a headquarters of a Juiz de Fora, an itinerant magistrate.

One of the caught fish inventory by Povoans noticed that, for instance, for the year of 1866, the product of transactions made in Póvoa, directly by the fishermen and fish traders, summed up 230 000$000 réis and the result of the fish sold from Caminha to Figueira da Foz valued 180 000$000 réis. The taxes paid in the fiscal station was of 5000$000 réis. Yearly Póvoa supplied the city of Porto with 1600 barrels of sardine and over 3000 loads of fish. However, the number of loads to Minho, Trás-os-Montes, and Beira Alta was inestimable. It was said that "the people who know Póvoa are sure that if, in any statistical map, could be truly accounted the importance of exported fish to those provinces, not much people would believe in it, because they would be marveled.»

=== Late 19th century fishing crisis ===
Late 19th century was tragic for Povoan fishermen due to over-fishing by vapors authorized by the national government, namely with small mesh nets that caught even young fish. The once abundant fish became rare in such a way that serious social problems emerged and lead to the emigration of the fishermen. On February 27, 1892, a tragedy devastated the community. Seven lanchas poveiras wrecked in a storm and 105 fishermen were killed, just meters off the shore.

== The Beautiful Era 1725–1974 ==
=== Healing baths, gambling and high-culture ===
Since 1725, the iodine-rich seawaters of Póvoa, due to the peculiar high quantities of seaweed, from the outlying kelp forests, that end up in Póvoa beaches, brought by ocean currents, lead that Benedictine monks choose to take sea-baths in Póvoa, in search of iodine (considered reinvigorating) and diving and sunbathing as a cure for skin and bone concerns. Some years later, but still in the 18th century, other people went to Póvoa with the same concerns.

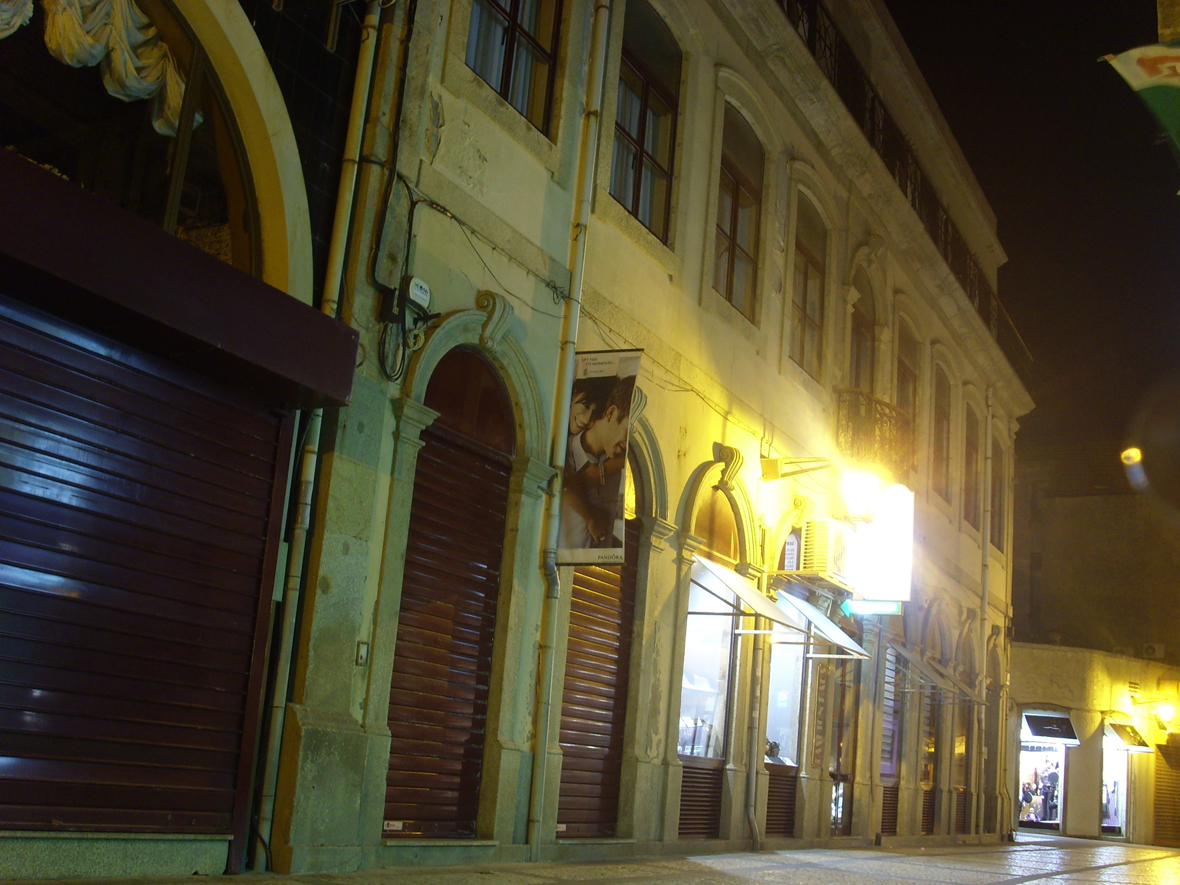
Former Luso-Brazileiro saloon in Largo do Café Chinês, one of the several gambling venues in 19th-century Póvoa.

Since the 19th century, the touristic activity became even more significant especially among the wealthiest classes from the Entre-Douro-e-Minho province and wealthy Portuguese-Brazilians, the city took a cosmopolitan character, leading to the affirmation of the bourgeoisie in Póvoa de Varzim City Center and the development of entertainment venues. Several hotels, theaters and casinos opened. Póvoa de Varzim flourished culturally. It then became renowned for its refined literary culture, artistic patronage in music and theater, and intellectual tertulia. It then became the most popular holiday destination in Northern Portugal,

Póvoa was not just known as a beach resort, but also for heated saltwater public baths, the "Banhos Quentes". the first public bath of Póvoa was Oceania which opened in Avenida dos Banhos, with entrance by Rua do Ramalhão, 13. After Oceania, the Balneário Povoense opened in Rua Tenente Valadim, near the present-day Casino, and the Balneário Lusitano in Passeio Alegre. Currently, there is still the belief that seawater has health healing effects, especially during low tide. There are popular sayings such as "When the tide is low, take a bath and go to bed or When the tide is low, wash your sore and it will be healed". In 1876, it was estimated that the town's waters attracted from 24 to 30 thousand visitors.

In 1876, Pinho Leal, a historian who studied Portugal in the finest of details, stated that tourism and fisheries transformed Póvoa de Varzim from a small village-like town into one of the most beautiful, prosperous and settled towns of Portugal. It was then one of the prime towns of Portugal, and, in all regards, far superior to many cities in the kingdom.

King Charles Albert of Sardinia arrived in Póvoa on April 18, 1849, coming from Italy with other four important people, coming in exile after losing the Battle of Novara and abdicated in favor of his son Victor Emmanuel, who would later become the first king of a unified Italy.

=== Napoleonic invasion ===
During the Napoleonic Wars and under the grand strategy Napoleon drafted, which included the invasion of Portugal using the corps of French Marshal Jean-de-Dieu Soult, the fortress of Póvoa de Varzim and that of Vila do Conde, in close proximity, were taken by French troops in late March 1809, as there were few troops in the region. The French control of the towns of Póvoa de Varzim and Vila do Conde lasted for almost two months. In May, Soult retreated throw the Marão and Gerês massifs, escaping the Anglo-Portuguese forces.

=== The territorial expansion of 1836 ===
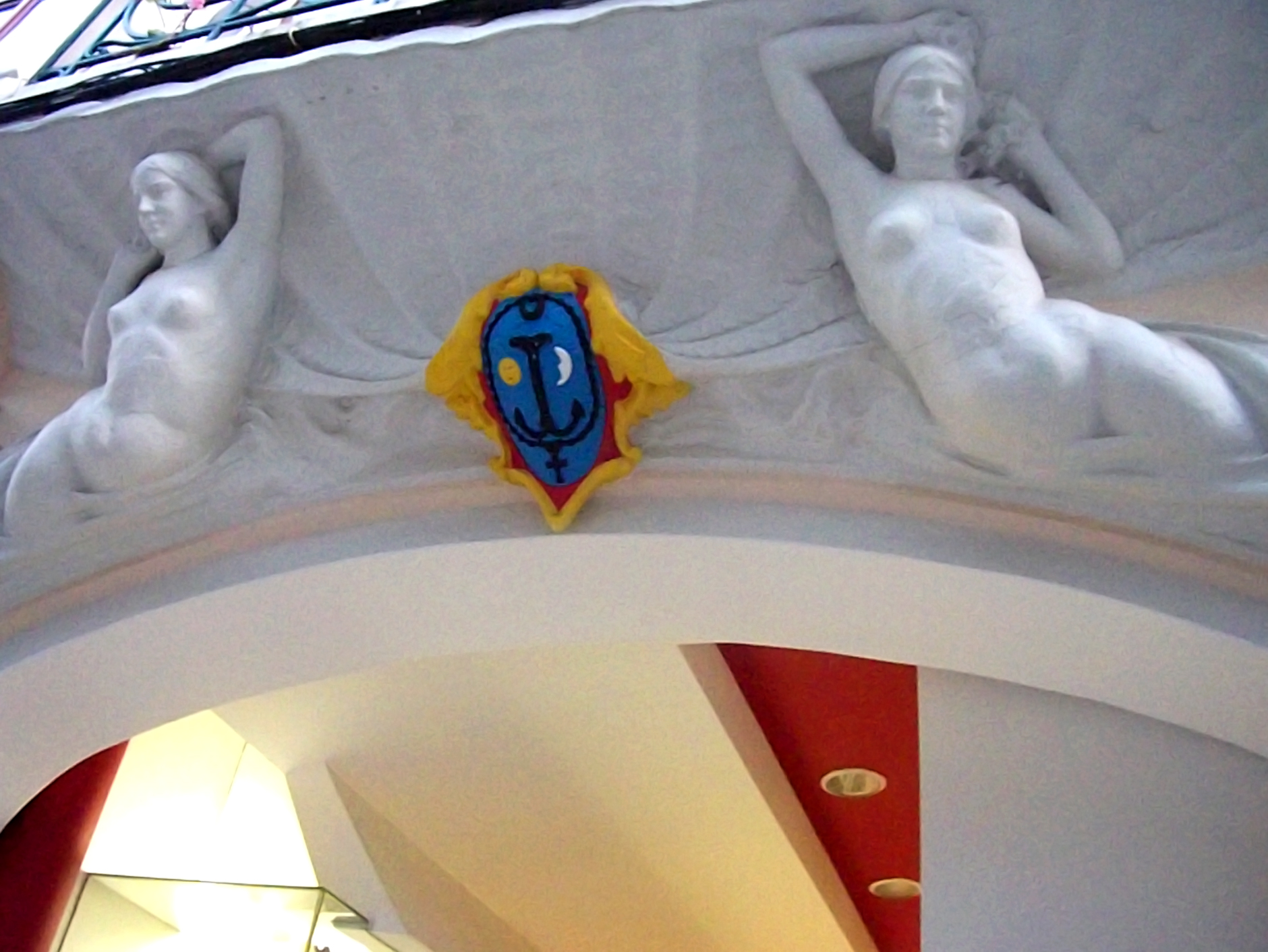
Coat of Arms of Póvoa de Varzim with the anchor representing safety at sea as the main symbol.

Despite being an historical town with significant autonomy, Póvoa only recovered most of its medieval territory with the 1836 administration reforms, as it gained parishes (paróquias) that were bounded to Barcelos, and from then on became civil parishes (paróquias civis or freguesias): Balasar, Estela, Laúndos, Navais, Terroso, Outeiro Maior, Parada, Rio Mau, Santagões, and what remained from the parish of Argivai. It also annexed Rates township, which was extinct.

However, Amorim and Beiriz, in the outskirts of Póvoa de Varzim were annexed to Vila do Conde, by the middle of the lands of Póvoa. Due to this, Póvoa started numerous complaints. By the intermediation of the Member of Parliament José Fortunato Ferreira de Castro a representation was signed to the Court in the session of May 22, 1837. But the claims of Póvoa were not met.

In 1842, the representation of the city hall of Póvoa de Varzim in the District's Geral Junta applied for the annexation of the civil parishes of Amorim and Beiriz, offering in exchange the ones of Outeiro Maior, Parada, and Santagões. In 1849, the city hall deliberated again to take the issue to the national parliament, for the second time. Along with the annexation of Amorim and Beiriz, its main concerns, it also applied for the parishes of Touginhó and Arcos because these were located north of the Este river.

By the reforms of December 31, 1853, it exchanged Outeiro Maior, Parada and Santagões for Amorim and Beiriz with neighboring Vila do Conde, thus solving its main concerns. However, against its wishes, Rio Mau was transferred to Vila do Conde and Balasar to Vila Nova de Famalicão. In 1854, the City Hall of Póvoa de Varzim applied for Balasar and Rio Mau to be returned, and applied, once more, for the annexation of Touginhó and Arcos that were in Vila do Conde.

On the other hand, Vila do Conde applied for the annexation of Argivai and Rates, and even organized a petition for the annexation of Póvoa, in order to establish a unified city, part of an idea supported by important people from both towns. The suggested name for the city was Mindello, honoring the landing of Liberal forces (the Bravos do Mindelo) during the Liberal Wars, an event that was still fresh in the memories of most at the time, which led to protests by the city hall of Póvoa de Varzim given the fact that, by then, Póvoa was significantly larger and doubled the number of houses that Vila do Conde had. After two years, Póvoa recovered Balasar that was transferred to Vila Nova de Famalicão. While the historical territorial disputes with Barcelos ended, territorial disputes with Vila do Conde started, with Póvoa de Varzim claiming land in Vila do Conde proper, most notably Poça da Barca, located in the Port of Póvoa de Varzim and settled by Povoans.

=== Early republicanism and restoration of the monarchy ===
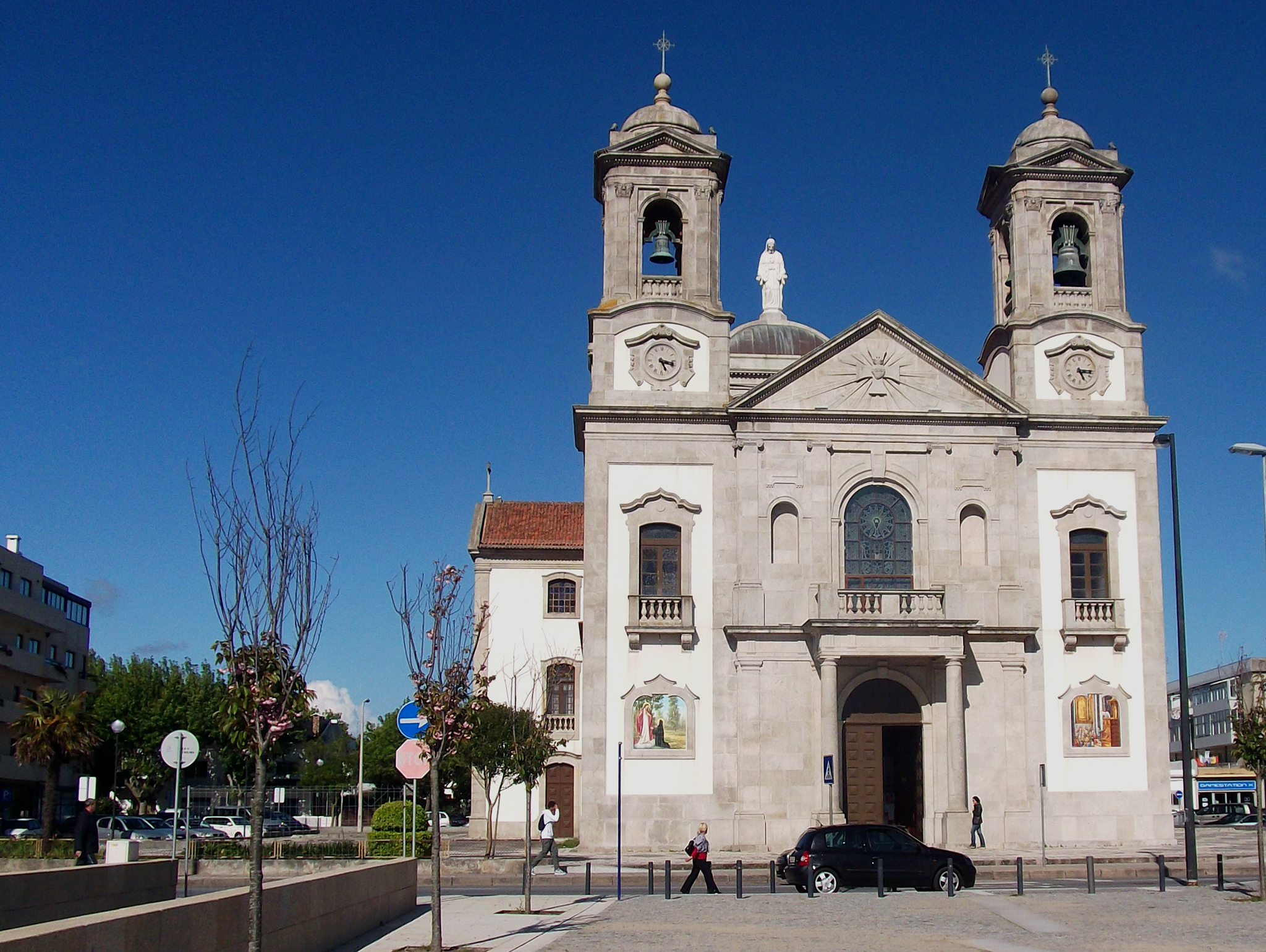
In 1890, the return of the Jesuit power represented by the construction of the Coração de Jesus Basilica and the British Ultimatum in Africa created a republican sentiment amongst local intellectuals.

The Julgado of Póvoa became a comarca (shire) on June 16, 1875. Despite that Póvoa did not beneficed much from the Liberal Regime. Póvoa de Varzim was actively involved in the Republican revolt of January 31, 1891 due to the 1890 British Ultimatum in Africa, with the actions of Rocha Peixoto, and the population sheltered and organized the flee to Spain, in a Poveiro boat, to Alves da Veiga. In that morning and while in Porto, Rocha Peixoto wrote a manifest for the people and, above all, workers; as a distraction tool for the Municipal Guard. In the previous night, in Póvoa's Café Suiço, some local intellectuals celebrated the upcoming revolution with Madeira wine.

Povoan elite, including Republicans and Freemasons, encouraged popular demonstrations against the Jesuits, specifically the 1901 demonstration, by believing the Jesuits were responsible for the ignorance and beliefs of the people. Laborers and craftsmen, with republican ideas, were responsible for most riots.

Despite those events, the establishment of the republic in 1910 was controversial to the local society. The hostilities between republicans and monarchists became more serious in 1917 and the Monarchy was declared as restored in Póvoa on January 20, 1919, a day after it was declared in Porto. An event that became known as Monarchy of the North. The insurgency lasted until February 13, 1919.

=== The coming of the railroads and new highways ===
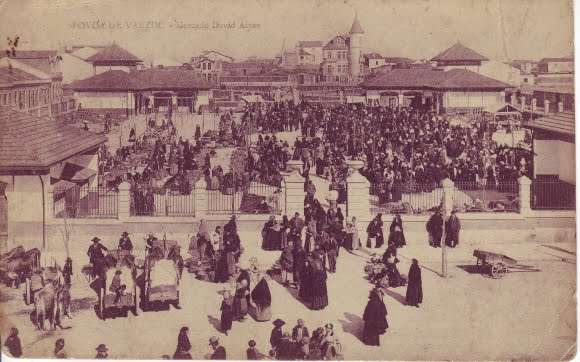
The Praça in 1909 - the Marquês de Pombal market square.

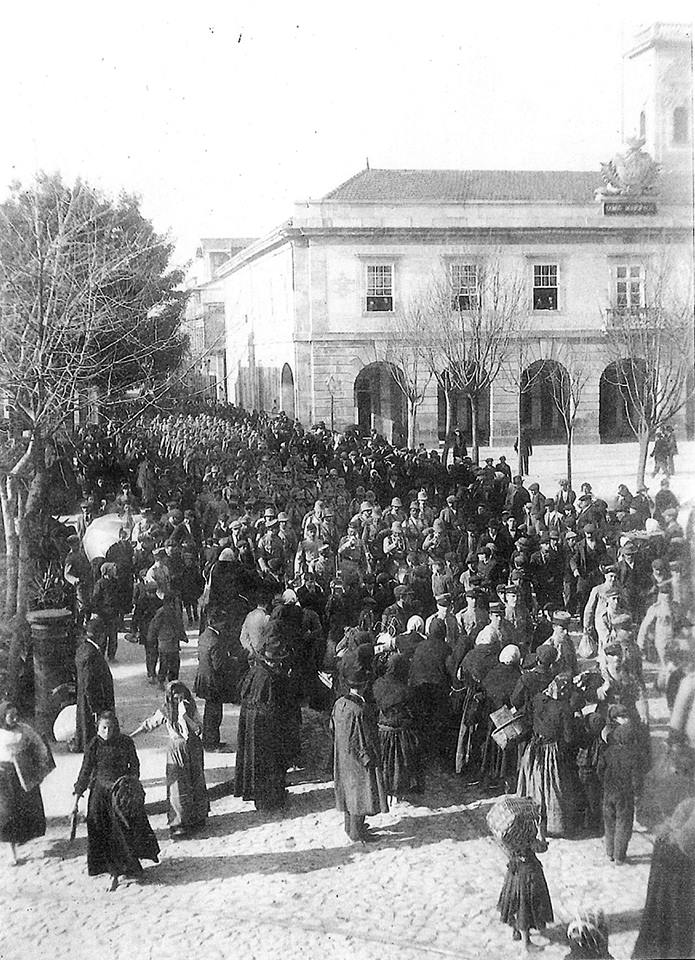
Praça do Almada in 1916. Portuguese military embarking for World War I in front of the city hall. This battalion was prepared and gathered in Póvoa de Varzim Military Barracks.

The end of the 19th century and early 20th century were important for transportation and the organization of Póvoa de Varzim and the development was stimulated by Póvoa de Varzim's importance in tourism and high-culture. The first urbanization project in the waterfront was created in 1891. National highways linking the city to Barcelos, Famalicão and Viana do Castelo opened. Private investors financed railways linking the city to Porto in 1875 and Lower Minho Region in 1878.

The local urbanization plan (Plano Geral de Melhoramentos) drafted in 1920 was a reference for early 20th century Portugal.

=== Estado Novo: Povoans as a stereotype for the Portuguese ===
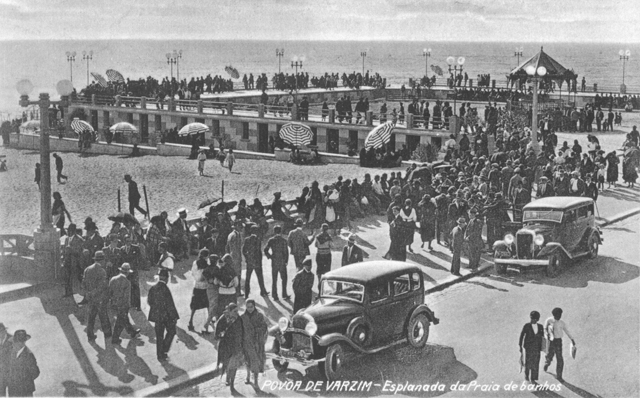
Avenida dos Banhos in the mid-20th century.

Salazar appreciated Póvoa de Varzim and its people. He popularized Cego do Maio all over Portugal, by a text in the schoolbooks of the fourth grade, and turned into a legend the dignity and courage of the humble fishermen of the region. Salazar was a common visitor to some local families, such as Virgínia Campos, Maria da Paz Varzim and the Amaral family. Important people of the state were often seen in the historical Ourivesaria Gomes Goldsmith in Rua da Junqueira.

Ala-Arriba!, a 1942 film, focusing on local fisher culture, family values and the importance of the sea, is considered a project of the Estado Novo regime by the financial support it had. It was financed by the National Propaganda Secretariat, the Unemployment Commission and the Ministry of Public Works. The film won the first international prize to Portuguese cinema.

The thriving textile, food and tourist industries and its development into the most popular holiday destination in northern Portugal, led to a major growth between the 1930s and 1960s. On December 16, 1948, the Anteplano de Urbanização da Póvoa de Varzim (Urbanization Pre-plan) was approved by the national government.

The Port of Póvoa de Varzim breakwaters started being built in 1939, a 200-year-old wish of the city, although the first works started in 1795. In the 1960s, the Palace of Justice was built using Soft Portuguese style, and Póvoa de Varzim was granted city status on June 16, 1973, by the decree 310/73. Then and unlike today, city status was prestigious and extremely rarely granted, but that status was often rejected by influential Povoans since the early 20th century.

== Decadence and contemporary Póvoa 1974–present ==
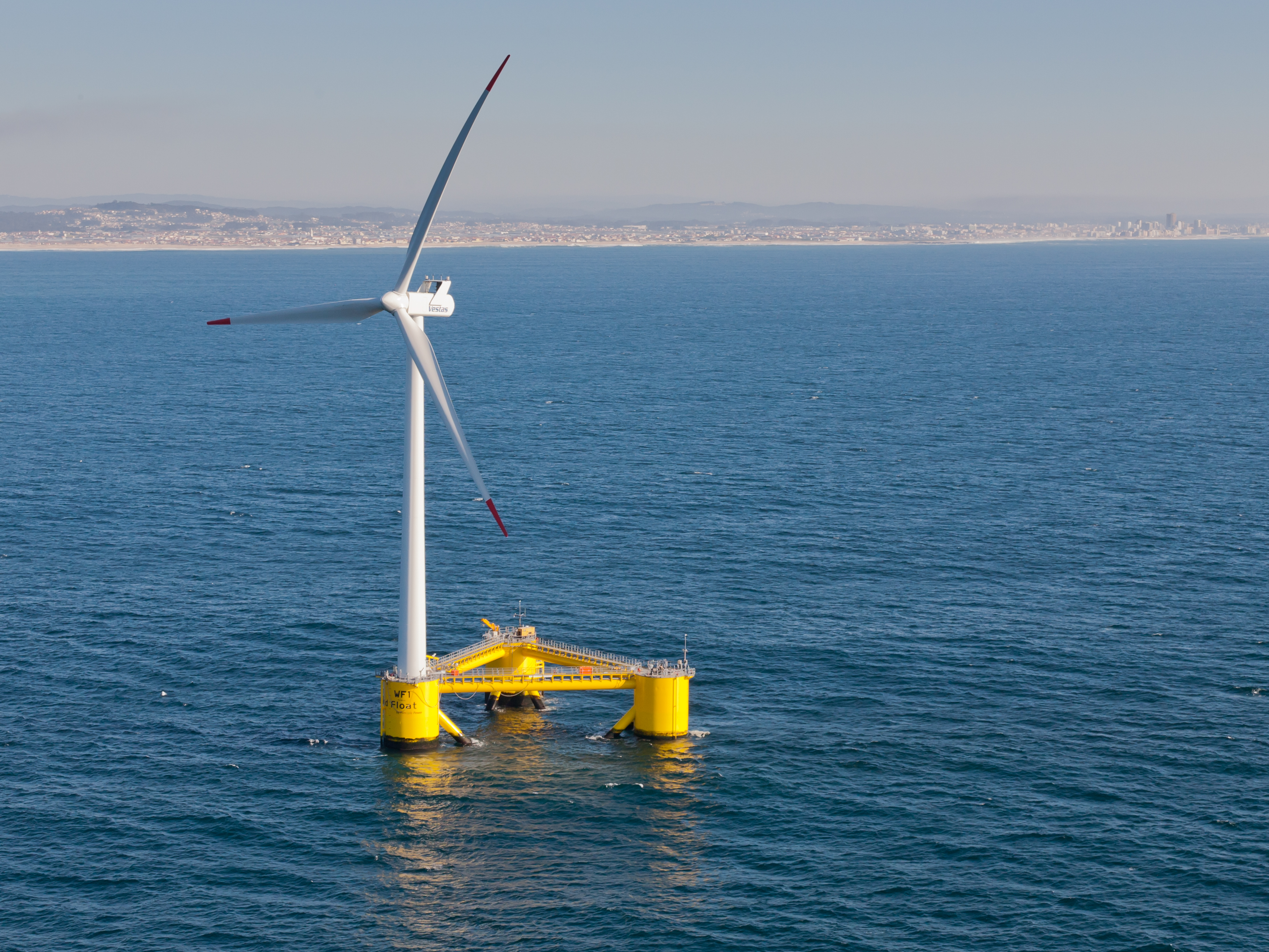
Póvoa de Varzim was in the news around the world due to renewable energy projects, such as the Floating wind turbine and the Aguçadoura Wave Farm. In the background, Póvoa de Varzim highrise district and the suburban sprawl.

In modern times, the fishing industry had lost most of its importance. Póvoa de Varzim became a service-sector city, but unlike other urban areas of Porto, it is not a dormitory community for commuters. Being one of northern Portugal's main locations, it developed a cosmopolitan style and serves as a centre for neighbouring towns.

At the end of the 1970s and throw the 1980s, the city started a new accelerated pace of urbanization, now with little regulation, ruled by real estate speculation both in the price of land fractions and construction, which resulted in the construction of high-rise buildings and expulsion, by gentrification processes, of the traditional population, especially the charismatic fishermen. These sold their properties to real estate agents and some moved to the free area south of the city: Caxinas and Poça da Barca in the municipality of Vila do Conde. And, in there, an accelerated pace of urbanization also occurred and Póvoa and Vila do Conde, until then separated by uninhabited land, merged. This ultimately led to the loss of population in the official area of the city, loss of regional influence and decadence.

In the 1990s the city had significantly expanded beyond the defined city limits and, by 1995, it was considered severely obsolete. The current area of the city, grouping several parishes, was defined on April 7, 1995 in the city council and the measures for the new urbanization plan were approved by the national government. In the end of 2002, the plan was subject to public discussion by the local community and was approved by the national government in January 2006.

The city's first higher education school, Escola Superior de Estudos Industriais e de Gestão, was founded in 1990 in Póvoa de Varzim City Center. This early school is the origin of the Póvoa de Varzim/Vila do Conde campus of Porto Polytechnic, its second campus after the one in Porto, it houses the Superior School of Hospitality and Tourism and the School of Media and Design.

At the end of the 1990s, the city was authorized by the national government to use some of the gambling profits for city redevelopment in the main streets and squares, marina and other venues. This coincided with a period of no governmental investment to the municipality as attributed by the government investment program, the PIDDAC, which provoked outrage.

In the early 2000s, the city started to expand inland to the suburban areas, with a new large avenue, the Avenida 25 de Abril, and the city park opened in 2009, after over a decade of planning. The urban population expanded by 23% between the 1991 and 2001 census, after losing 1.3% in the previous decade. In 2011 census, Póvoa de Varzim municipality lost population for the first time in modern history, a -0.1% decrease, due to a strong population decline in the coastal agricultural parishes north of the city (Aguçadoura, Navais and Estela). The city center kept attracting inhabitants with a 2.2% population increase. According to statistics, Póvoa de Varzim lost population between 2009 and 2016, similarly to most of Portugal. In 2017, it was one of the few municipalities in Northern Portugal to halt population loss comparing to 2016 by showing a marginal increase in population, mostly due to legal foreign residents. In the census of 2021, Póvoa de Varzim was one of the few cities in Northern Portugal to experience a population expansion with 3.5% increase in the main civil parish, stronger urban population growth made Póvoa de Varzim experience the fifth largest expansion in Northern Portugal with 1.4% increase, despite continued population loss in the countryside.

== Historic streets and squares ==
- History of Gambling in Póvoa de Varzim: David Alves Square, Passeio Alegre;
- History of Theater in Póvoa de Varzim: Rua Santos Minho;
- Civic center History: Dores Square (Roman-early Medieval), Praça Velha (Medieval-Age of Discovery), Praça do Almada (Enlightenment-Contemporary);
- Market square: Praça Velha (Medieval-Renaissance), Praça do Almada (Enlightenment-19th century), Praça Marquês de Pombal (contemporary);
- Shopping street: Rua da Junqueira;
- Historic touristic thoroughfares: Avenida dos Banhos, Avenida Mousinho de Albuquerque, Passeio Alegre, David Alves Square, Praça da República (early hotels).
