= Sejães, Póvoa de Varzim =

Coordinates: 41.4167°N 8.7218°W

Sejães is a hamlet in the combined civil parish of Aver-o-Mar, Amorim e Terroso, municipality of Póvoa de Varzim in northern Portugal. In the vicinity of the hamlet is Cividade Hill. Sejães had a population of 349 in 2011. Prior to the creation in 2013 of the merged parish, Sejães was included within the civil parish of Terroso.
