= Pedro Paulo (footballer, born 1973) =

Portuguese footballer

Personal information
- Full name: Pedro Paulo Saraiva António
- Date of birth: 21 November 1973
- Place of birth: Luanda, Angola
- Date of death: 23 February 2000 (aged 26)
- Place of death: Amorim, Póvoa de Varzim, Portugal
- Height: 1.65 m (5 ft 5 in)
- Position: Central midfielder

Youth career
- 1985–1989: União Santarém
- 1989–1992: Sporting CP

Senior career*
Years	Team	Apps	(Gls)
1992–1993	Vasco da Gama (Sines)	28	(3)
1993–1995	Benfica Castelo Branco	59	(9)
1995	Birmingham City	0	(0)
1995–1996	Darlington	6	(0)
1996	Naval	10	(6)
1996–1997	União Lamas	29	(3)
1997–1999	Marítimo	13	(0)
1999	Camacha		
1999–2000	Esposende	4	(0)
- * Club domestic league appearances and goals

Pedro Paulo Saraiva António (21 November 1973 – 23 February 2000), known as Pedro Paulo, was a Portuguese footballer who played as a central midfielder in the Primeira Divisão and the UEFA Cup for Marítimo. He also appeared in the second tier for União Lamas and Esposende, in the third tier for Vasco da Gama (Sines), Benfica Castelo Branco and Camacha, and in the English Third Division (fourth tier) for Darlington.

He began his football career in the junior teams of União Santarém and then Sporting CP, before making his senior debut with Vasco da Gama in the 1992–93 Segunda Divisão B. He was also on the books of Naval, and spent time with English Division Two (third-tier) club Birmingham City without playing first-team football for them.

Pedro Paulo was born in Luanda, Angola. He died in a car crash near Amorim, Póvoa de Varzim, Portugal, in February 2000 at the age of 26. He was married with a young son.
