= Castro ceramics =

Pottery of the Castro Culture (Iberian Peninsula)

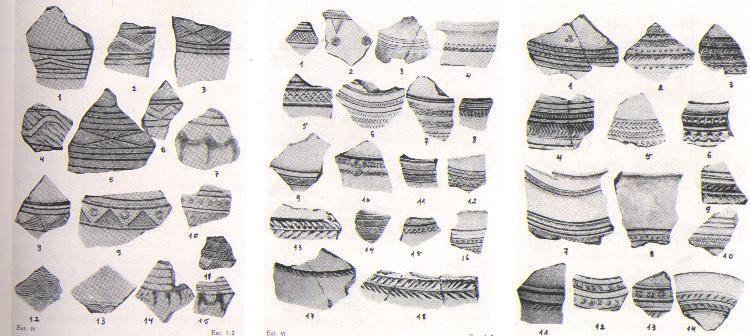
Ceramic drawings in Terroso

Castro ceramics were a part of the Castro Culture of the northwestern Iberian Peninsula. The ceramics were made mostly by hand, although in some cases a pottery wheel was used. In many cases, signs of smoothing and flattening are visible on the pots.

== Themes ==
The designs on the pottery are predominantly globe-like and spherical. Another common characteristic is that the designs often include one or more wings. The walls are generally flat and even, while the bottom remains unfinished, though there are some exceptions.

The decorative themes on the pottery are fairly uniform. Common designs are of parallel vertical and horizontal lines, triangles, stars, S-shaped patterns, and fish-spine designs. Also common were interlaced designs, impressions using ropes or "mamelóns", as well as other varied ornamental designs. The major part of the ceramics were plain and undesigned, however.

== Uses ==
The larger bowls were mainly used to store food (such as grains) or liquids. Other pots were used for cooking in a fireplace type area. Smaller ones were used for food and drink in everyday meals.

Some of these ceramics were used in conjunction with or instead of tools made of wood or wicker.

Also common was a form of barbecue grill, using spits, for grilling food. These are easily identifiable as a result of the holes in the walls and the back of the stone structure where the food was cooked. The materials used to make these ovens were made by hand and were also made and fashioned using small ovens to help the metals become ductile or malleable.

== See also ==
- Castro culture
- Castro (village)
