= Santo André, Póvoa de Varzim =

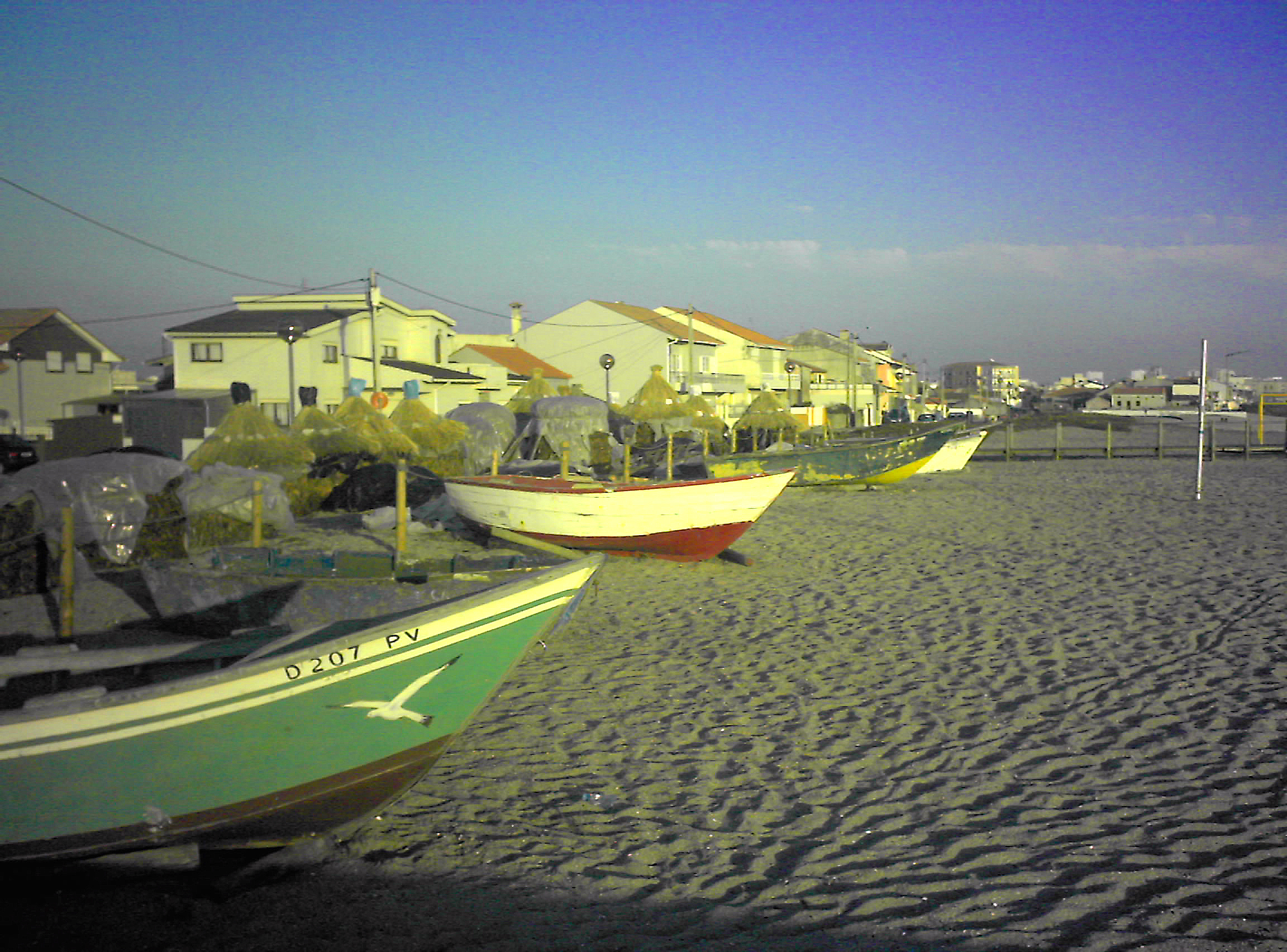
Boats and sargassum "Medas".

Santo André is an area surrounding Cape Santo André in the Portuguese municipality of Póvoa de Varzim, whose territory runs along the northern shoreline of the parish of A Ver-o-Mar (also known as Quião) and south shoreline of Aguçadoura. It is an ancient fishing colony of Póvoa de Varzim.

The A Ver-o-mar part was integrated in the city, given that it is urbanely continuous. Santo André keeps an unchanged fishing character identified by family homes that have grown up in a spontaneous way.

Near Cape Santo André, there is a rocky formation known as Penedo do Santo (Saint's Rock), which has a mark that the Povoan fishermen believe to be a footprint of Saint Andrew (Portuguese: Santo André). The site is a relevant archaeological site, with evidences of Romanization and Stone Age paintings to Póvoa de Varzim and of ancient religious and cultural importance to Povoans.

The Santo André Chapel was built in the 16th century. In Povoan Mythology, Saint Andrew is the Boatman of Souls and that he frees the souls of those whom drown in the sea, fishing them from the depths of the ocean after a shipwreck. The celebration of Saint Andrew occurs on the dawn of the last day of November, when groups of men and women, wearing black hoods and holding lamps, go to the chapel throw the beach.
