= Amorim, Póvoa de Varzim =

Suburb of Póvoa de Varzim, northern Portugal

Coordinates: 41.406°N 8.747°W

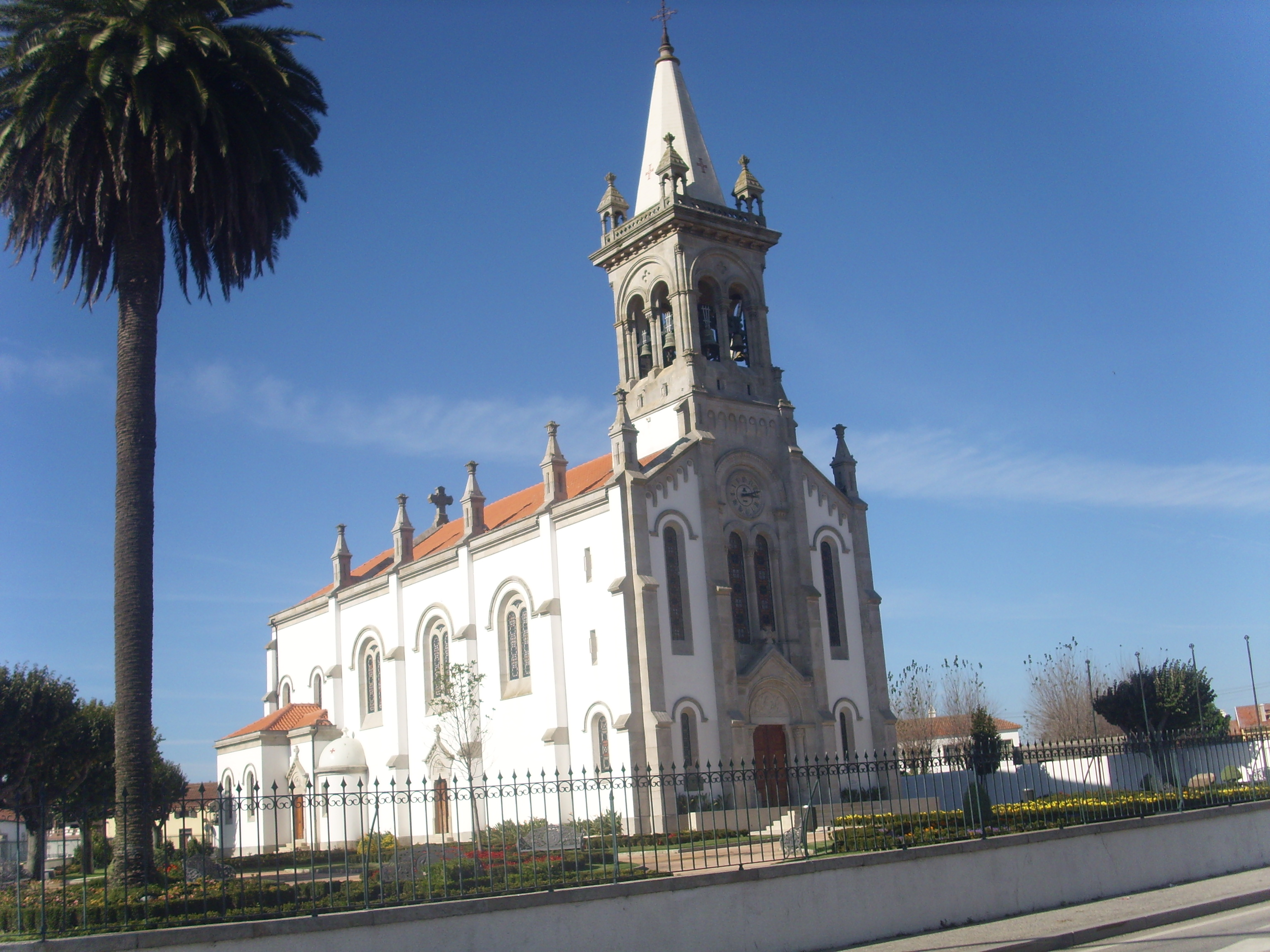
Saint James Parish Church in Neo-Romanesque style.

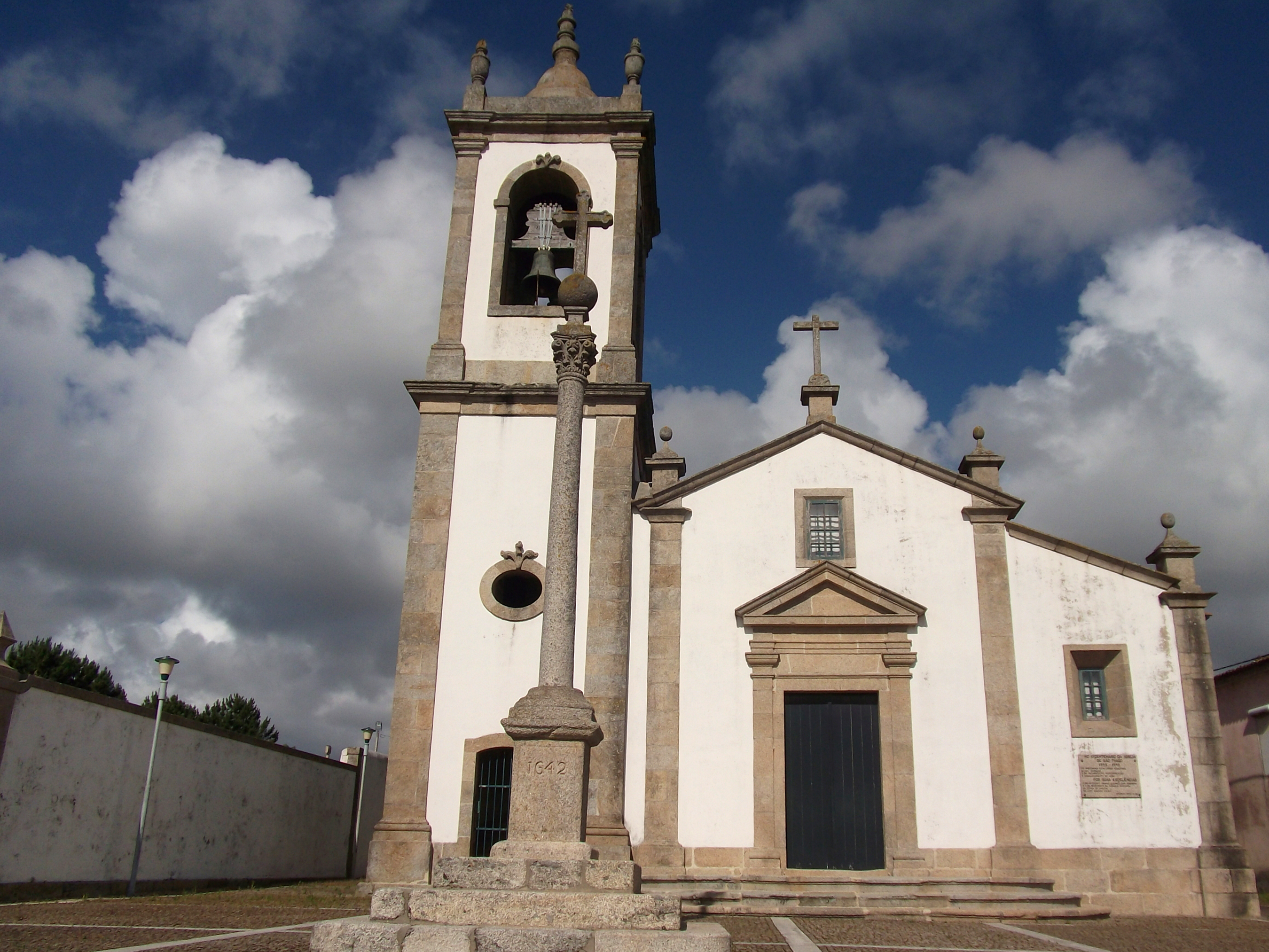
Old Saint James Parish Church. Currently with manneirist style (16th century), it is of Medieval Romanesque origin.

Amorim is a suburban area in Póvoa de Varzim, Portugal. It is an ancient ecclesiastical parish and former civil parish. It is bordered by Aver-o-Mar to the west and by Terroso to the east. In the census of 2001, it had a population of 2,856 inhabitants and a total area of 5.65 km^{2}. In 2013, it was amalgamated in the civil parish known as União das Freguesias de Aver-o-Mar, Amorim e Terroso.

Amorim is derived from Latin, and means dating/love or couples place. The Portuguese surnames Amorim and Morim can be traced to this parish. It is popular in the city for its bread, characteristically eaten at high temperatures just after being made – the Broa de Amorim.

== History ==
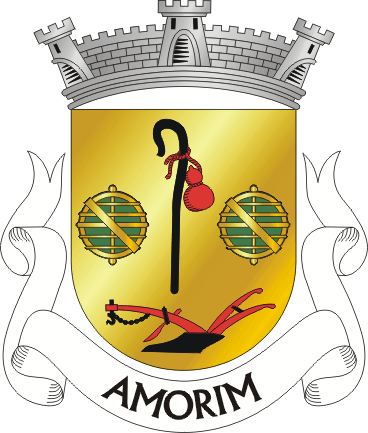
The shield of Amorim used while it was a civil parish.

The parish is known to exist from, at least, the 11th century onward. The name of the parish Santiago de Amorim first appeared in 1033.

Amorim belonged to Barcelos until 1836 when it was transferred to Vila do Conde. Póvoa de Varzim and Vila do Conde made parish transfers in 1853, and Amorim was made part of Póvoa de Varzim since then.

In 1922, the locality of A Ver-o-Mar became an independent parish.

== Geography ==
Amorim is located just east of the city of Póvoa de Varzim; and borders Navais to the north, Terroso to the northwest, Beiriz to the southeast and Aver-o-Mar to the west.

=== Localities ===
| Locality | Inhabitants (2011) |
|---|---|
| Agra | 296 |
| Aldeia | 76 |
| Aldeia Nova | 77 |
| Amorim de Cima | 326 |
| Cadilhe | 429 |
| Cardosas | 289 |
| Esqueirinhas | 29 |
| Fontainhas | 30 |
| Mandim | 235 |
| Mourilhe | 64 |
| Pedroso | 153 |
| Póvoa de Varzim | 168 |
| Sistelos | 73 |
| Torrinha | 147 |
| Travassos | 392 |

=== City districts ===
Amorim, despite being continuous to the city, only a section of it is considered part of the city:

- Parque da Cidade (eastern part)
- Barreiros, Póvoa de Varzim (eastern part)
