= A Ver-o-Mar =

Area of Póvoa de Varzim, Portugal

Coordinates: 41°24′N 8°46′W

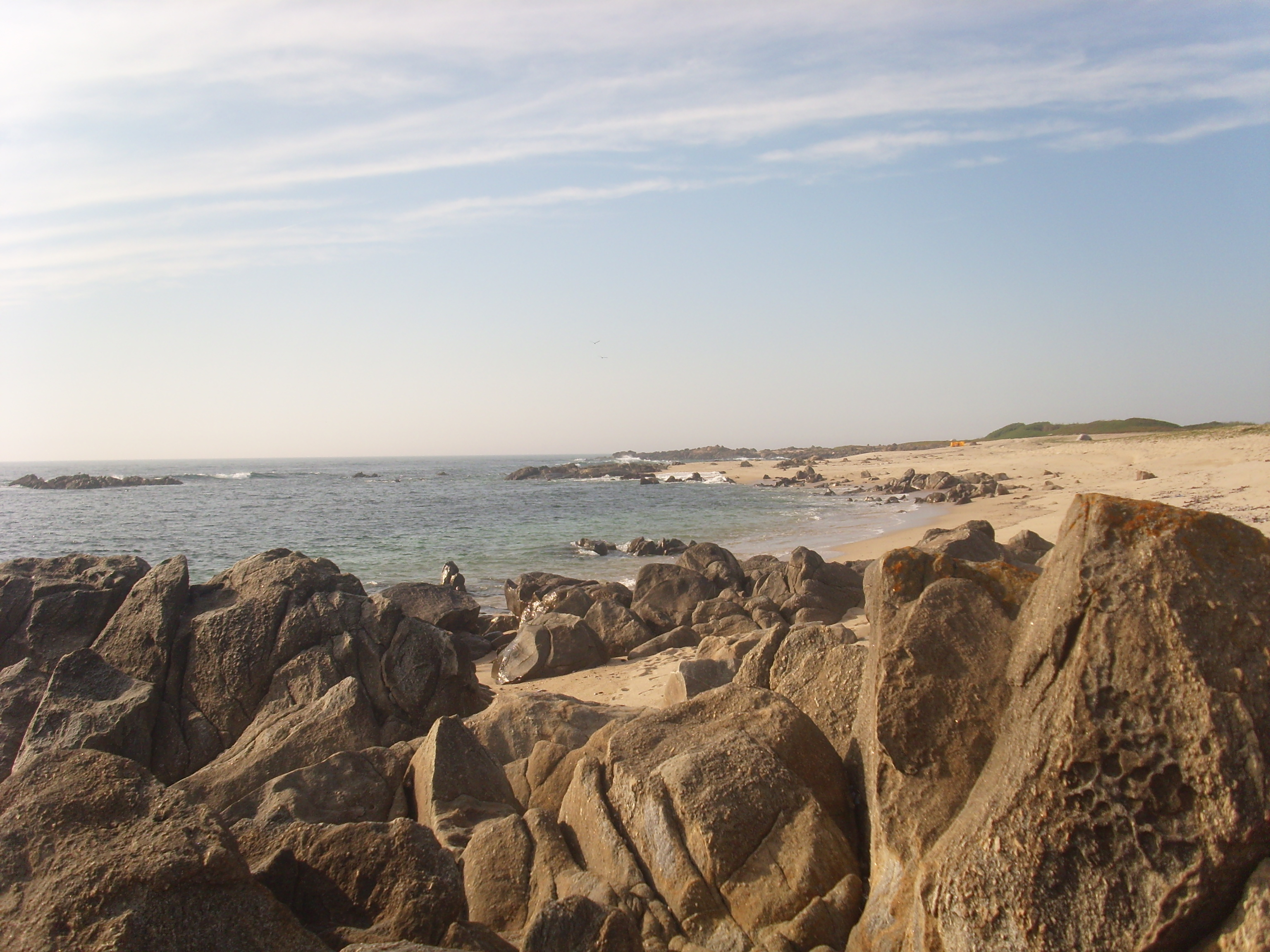
The rocky Quião Beach, near Cape Santo André, is a notable beach habitat.

A Ver-o-Mar, Aver-o-Mar or Averomar is an urban area in Póvoa de Varzim, Portugal. It is a former civil parish currently located in União das Freguesias de Aver-o-Mar, Amorim e Terroso, of which it is its seat. In the census of 2001, it had a population of 8,675 inhabitants and a total area of 5.21 km^{2}. A 2012 law merged the parish with neighbouring Amorim and Terroso, becoming the northern parish of the city of Póvoa de Varzim.

== History ==
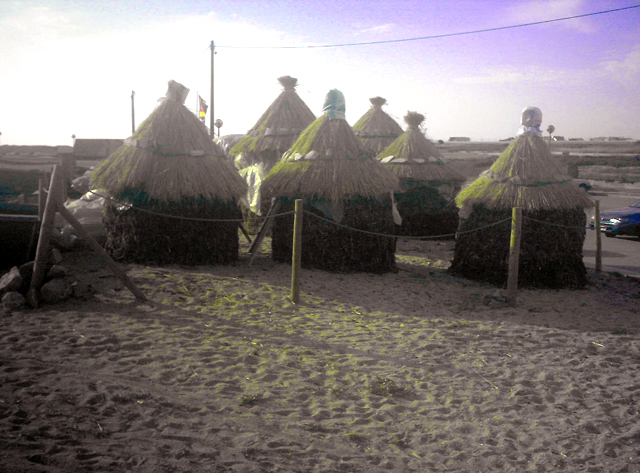
Sargassum seaweed is sun-dried on the beach for use as fertilizer

A Ver-o-Mar was once a fishing-farmer village in the north of the city of Póvoa de Varzim and became an independent parish from Amorim in 1922.

It has been part of the urban area of the city of Póvoa de Varzim since the 1995 city limits expansion and gained town status on July 1, 2003. In January 2006 the national government approved and recognized the extension of the city of Póvoa de Varzim to this and three other parishes.

== Geography ==
Cape Santo André is located in the north of the parish. The Esteiro River divides the parish in two parts: north and south. The south of Aver-o-Mar is grouped with the north of Bairro Norte and is known as Agro-Velho and is an urban and beach resort district. On the other hand, Santo André (today considered the extreme north of the city) in the north shoreline of the parish has retained its old fishing character related with Bairro Sul (in the extreme south). The centre of Aver-o-Mar is located around Nossa Senhora das Neves Avenue.

=== Hamlets ===
The parish has 18 hamlets: Agro-Velho, Aldeia Nova, Boucinha, Caramuja, Fontes Novas, Fragosa, Mourincheira, Paço, Paranho, Paranho de Areia, Palmeiro, Perlinha, Finisterra, Paralheira, Refojos, Sencadas, Santo André, and Sesins.

=== City districts ===
The parish of Aver-o-Mar contains three of the eleven city districts:

- A Ver-o-Mar
- Agro-Velho (north part)
- Parque da Cidade (west part)
