= Aver-o-Mar, Amorim e Terroso =

- Civil parish
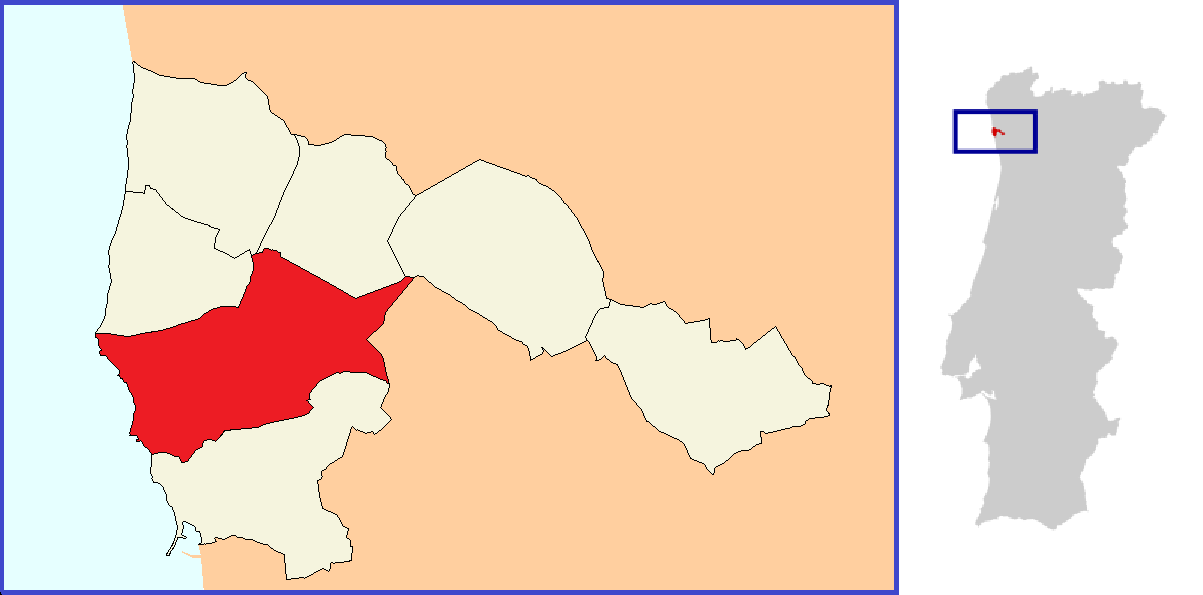
- Coordinates: 41.41°N 8.75°W
- Country: Portugal
- Region: Norte
- Metropolitan area: Porto
- District: Porto
- Municipality: Póvoa de Varzim

Area
  - Total: 16.64 km^{2} (6.42 sq mi)

Population (2011)
  - Total: 13,987
  - Density: 840/km^{2} (2,200/sq mi)
- Time zone: UTC+00:00 (WET)
  - Summer (DST): UTC+01:00 (WEST)

União das Freguesias de Aver-o-Mar, Amorim e Terroso is the north side region of the Portuguese city of Póvoa de Varzim and one of the seven civil parishes of Póvoa de Varzim. The administrative parish evolved from the amalgamation of the former parishes Aver-o-Mar, Amorim and Terroso. The population in 2011 was 13,987, in an area of 16.64 km².

According to Póvoa de Varzim's municipal spatial planning, the parish is divided into two areas, one urban (Aver-o-Mar and a portion of Amorim) and two suburban areas (Amorim and Terroso), these are divided by the A28 motorway.

Landmarks include Póvoa de Varzim City Park, the ruins of the Cividade de Terroso, the beaches of Aver-o-Mar, and the hillside village of Terroso.

== History ==
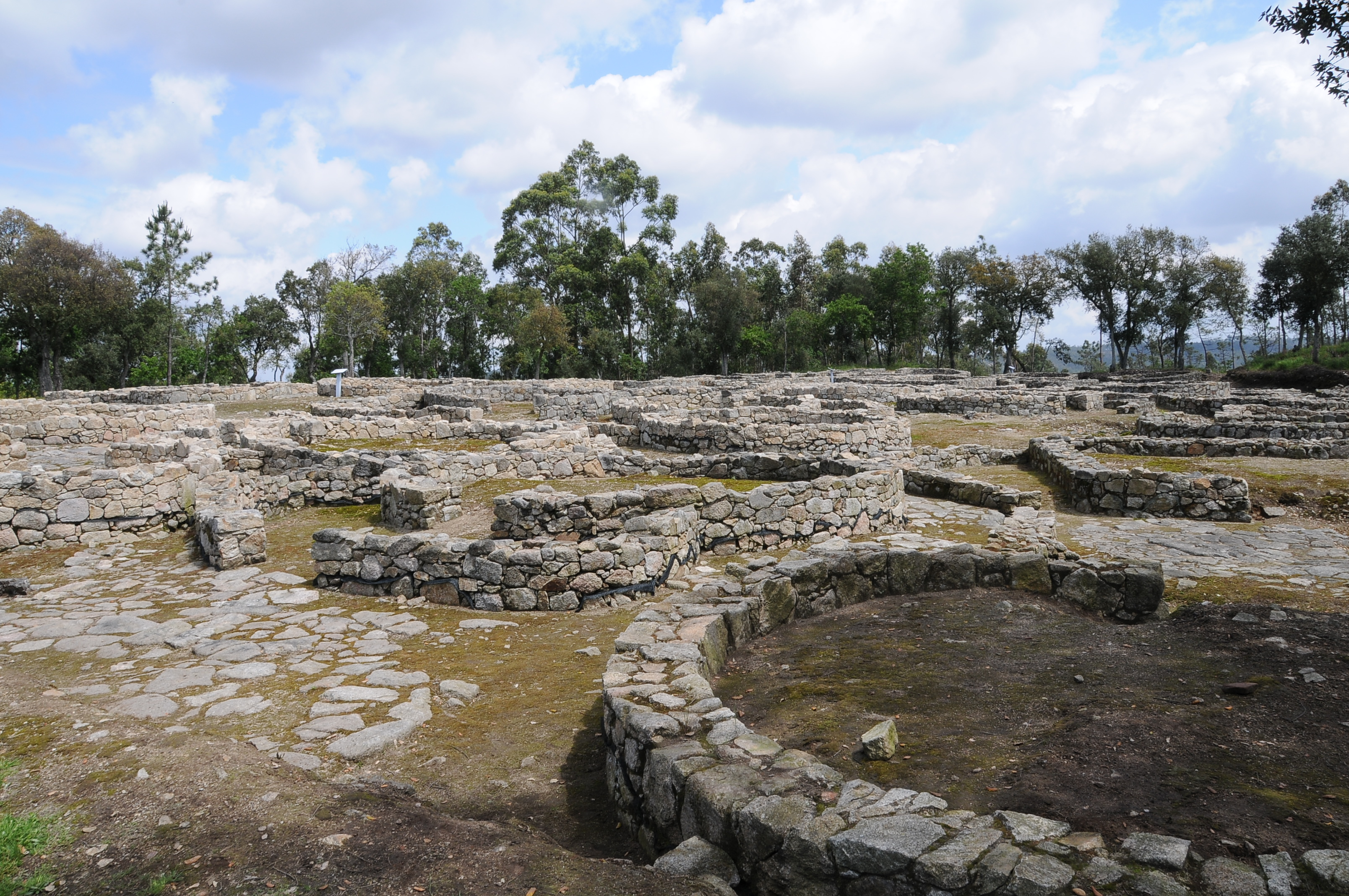
Cividade de Terroso.

The civil parish was established in 2013 under the national administrative reform. It is as an amalgamation of three former civil and ecclesiastic parishes. Amorim and Terroso are ancient parishes with known records dating to the 11th century, with civil parishes established in 1836. Aver-o-Mar was established in 1922.
