= Barreiros, Póvoa de Varzim =

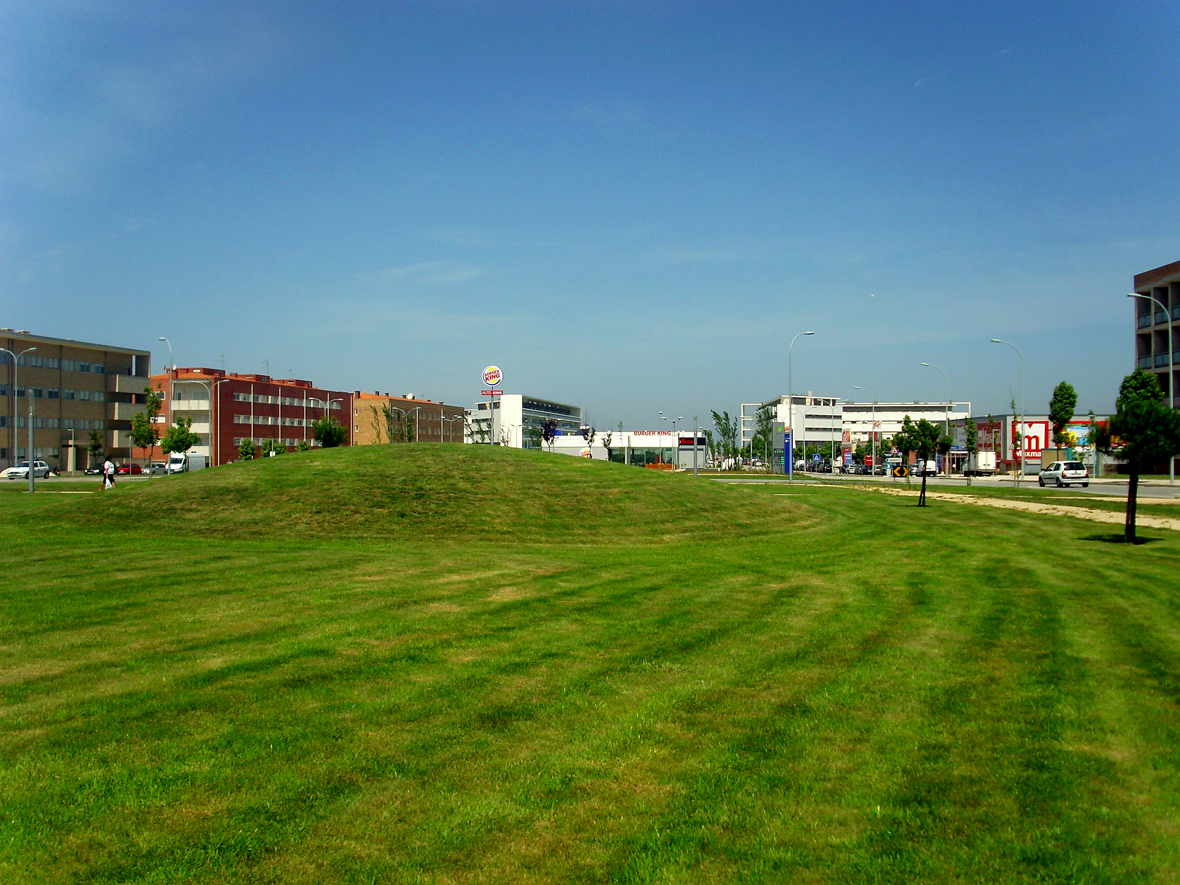
The Garden of Avenida 25 de Abril.

Barreiros is a neighbourhood of the Portuguese city of Póvoa de Varzim. It is considered an inland expansion of Bairro Norte.

Barreiros appears, for the first time, in a document of 1577. During that time, the place was an extensive territory of woodland and farm fields.

Currently, it is a neighbourhood with strong urban expansion, with a new central area in 25 de Abril Avenue. In the neighbourhood some municipal facilities are found, such as the Municipal Auditorium and the Municipal Pavilion.
