= Terroso =

Locality and former civil parish in Portugal

Coordinates: 41.416°N 8.729°W

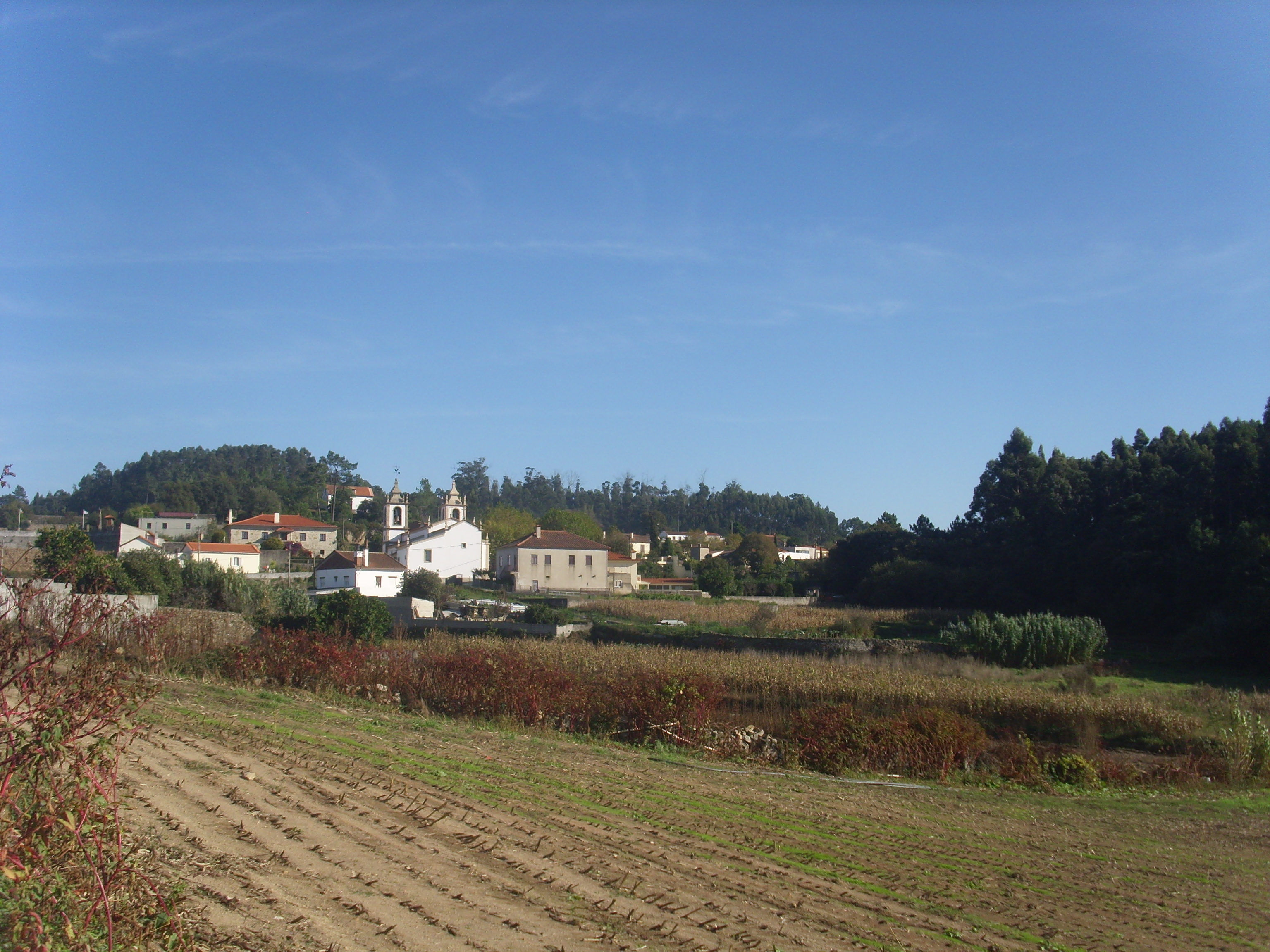
Village of Terroso on the western side of the Cividade Hill.

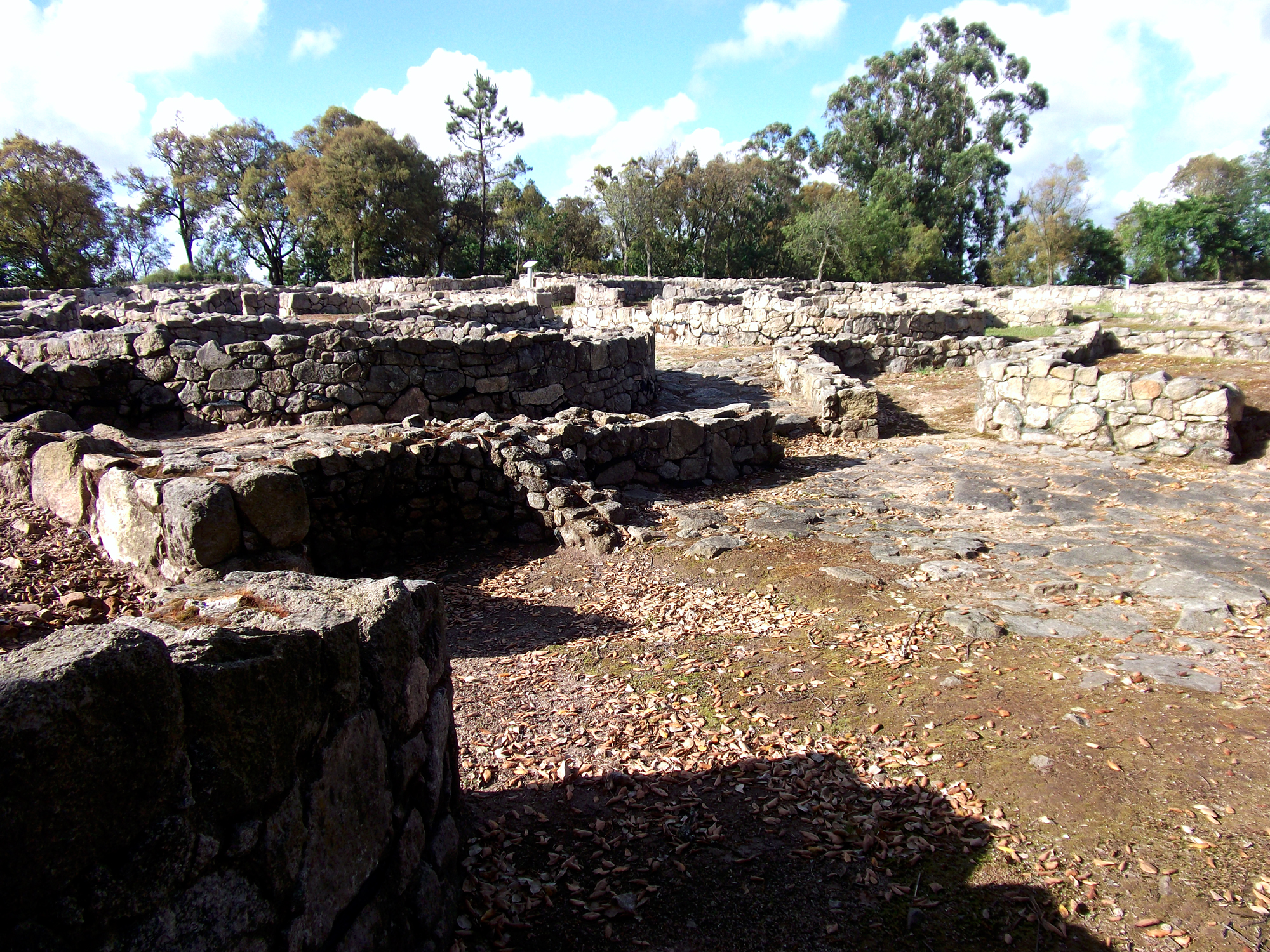
Cividade de Terroso on top of the hill.

Terroso is a suburban area in Póvoa de Varzim, Portugal. It forms part of the civil parish of Aver-o-Mar, Amorim e Terroso. It is an ancient ecclesiastical parish and former civil parish. In the census of 2001, it had a population of 2,472 inhabitants and a total area of 4.63 km^{2}. A 2012 law merged the civil parish with neighbouring Amorim and Aver-o-Mar, to become the northern parish of the city of Póvoa de Varzim.

Terroso derives from the Latin terrosu, meaning "full of soil". The name was used for Cividade or Cividade Hill.

== History ==
Cividade de Terroso, an ancient Castro city established around 900 and 800 BC is located in the parish of Terroso. But the parish has been shaped by man since much earlier times. Tumuli are known to exist in the area, such as in Leira da Anta and Cortinha da Fonte da Mama. Mamoa de Sejães still exists unbroken after thousands of years.

The earliest reference to Terroso dates from 953: "subtus montis Terroso", referring to its hill.

The remains of a castle tower built in the 13th and 14th centuries can still be found in the Hamlet of Paço.

The parish church was built in the first half of the 16th century. It was erected under the orders of King Manuel I. It went through several alterations over the centuries that have changed the original design. The latest involved the building of a second tower with a small carillon. The best piece is a 16th-century statue of the Virgin with legendary origins, probably an Italian work.

A chapel dedicated to Saint Savior (São Salvador) was built in the hamlet that took its name. It contains a proto-baroque altar with a painting depicting the miracle of the Battle of Ourique. Also from the 17th century there is a small structure that marks the beginning of the aqueduct. It has 4 columns of the Tuscan order holding a small tile roof. It houses a polychromous statue of St Anthony.

The Hamlet of Santo António takes its name from a large baroque chapel dedicated to St. Anthony. The interior of the chapel has some good quality golden gilded carved wood altars.

During the Middle Ages it was part of Varzim and the hill was used as one of the borders of the fiefdom under the medieval military and administrative reference "subtus mons civitas Terroso". In the modern period, it was under the administration of Barcelos, when it was transferred to the municipality of Póvoa de Varzim in 1836.

== Geography ==
Terroso is located 5 km north of downtown Póvoa de Varzim; and is bordered by Navais and Estela to the north; Laundos and the municipality of Vila do Conde to the east; Amorim to the west and Beiriz to the south. Most of the parish is crowned by Cividade Hill and it extends to São Lourenço plain.

Cividade Hill was known for its pure waters, and an aqueduct was raised in the 17th century, stretching to the Monastery of Santa Clara in Vila do Conde.

=== Hamlets ===
The parish is divided into 15 hamlets:

- São Lourenço
- Carregal
- Passô
- Santo António
- Paço
- Póvoas
- São Pedro
- São Salvador
- Paranho
- Vilar
- Boavista
- Sejães
- Certainha
- Ordem
- Pé do Monte
