= High River (disambiguation) =

High River is a town in Alberta, Canada.

High River may also refer to:

- High River (provincial electoral district), an electoral district of Alberta, Canada between 1905 and 1930
- High River (territorial electoral district), an electoral district of the Northwest Territories, Canada between 1884 and 1905
- Alto River (Portuguese: Rio Alto), a river of Portugal
- RCAF Station High River
