= Peter of Rates =

Portuguese bishop and saint

Saint Peter of Rates
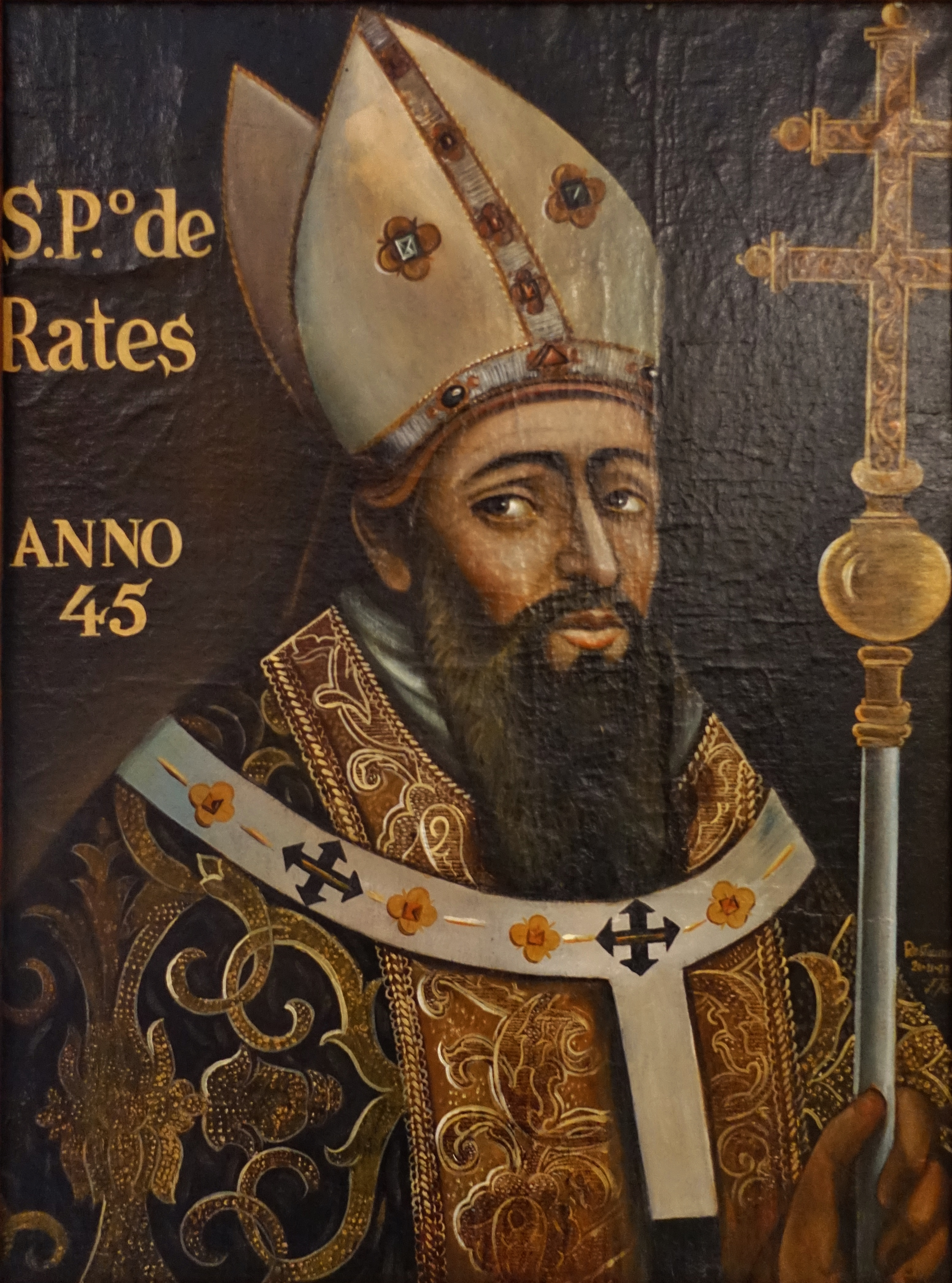
- Saint Peter of Rates, Archbishop of Braga

Bishop and Martyr
- Born: unknown
- Died: c. 60 northern Portugal
- Venerated in: Catholic Church; Eastern Orthodox Church
- Major shrine: Church of Saint Peter of Rates, Rates, Póvoa de Varzim
- Feast: 26 April

Peter of Rates (Portuguese: Pedro de Rates), also known in English as Peter of Braga, is traditionally considered to be the first bishop of Braga between the years AD 45 and 60. Tradition says he was ordered to preach the Christian faith by James the Great, and that Peter of Rates was martyred while attempting to convert the locals to the Christian faith in northern Portugal. The ancient Breviary of Braga (Breviarium Bracarense) and the Breviary of Evora hold that Peter of Rates was a disciple of James and preached in Braga. However, the Bollandists say that this claim is "purely traditional."

== Life ==
The document holds that James, one of the apostles of Christ, visited the northwest of the Iberian Peninsula in AD 44. One of his alleged visits occurred at Serra de Rates, in the current municipality of Póvoa de Varzim. During his visit, the apostle is said to have ordained the local Peter of Rates as the first bishop of Braga. This is probably a myth, given that it is proven that James was celebrating Easter in Jerusalem precisely in this year.

It is believed that Peter of Rates was beheaded while converting believers of the Roman religion to the Christian faith.

== The discovery of Peter's body ==
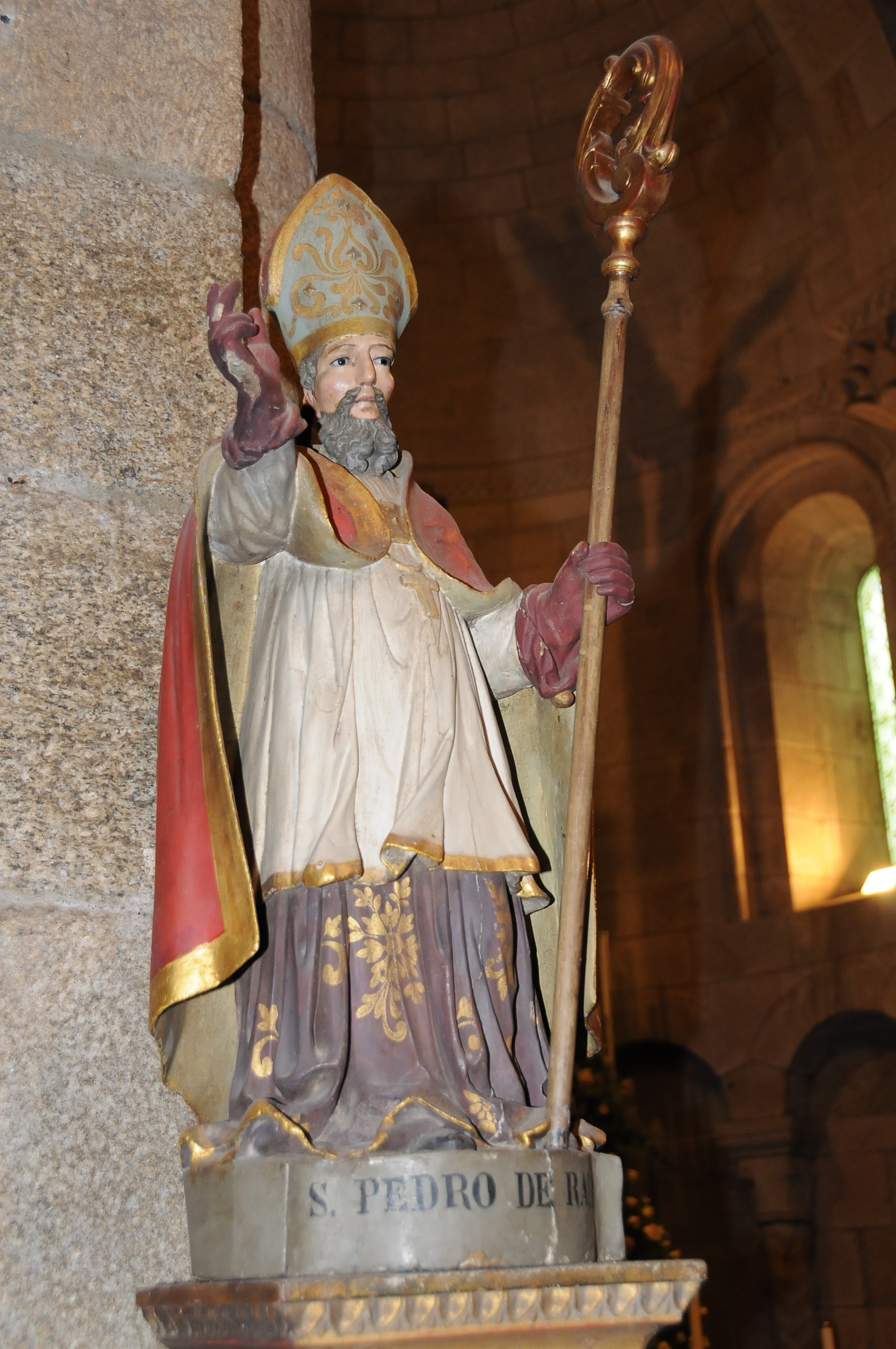
Statue of Saint Peter of Rates, Monastery of Rates

Centuries later, around the 9th century, the discovery of Peter's body was attributed to Felix the Hermit, a fisherman of Villa Mendo, an ancient Roman villa that existed until the early years of the Kingdom of Portugal, and rediscovered in the 20th century under the sand dunes of Rio Alto in Estela, also in Póvoa de Varzim.

Felix had left home and settled in the biggest hill of the area, which is today known as São Félix Hill. According to legend, Félix regularly observed a light in the darkness of the night from the hill. One day, curious about the light's origins, Felix came upon the body of Peter of Rates. On that spot, the Romanesque Monastery of Rates was built, and the relics kept there until 1552; in that year the body was transferred to Braga Cathedral, where it is still kept. Scientific studies suggest that the body kept in Braga is from a 9th-century child.

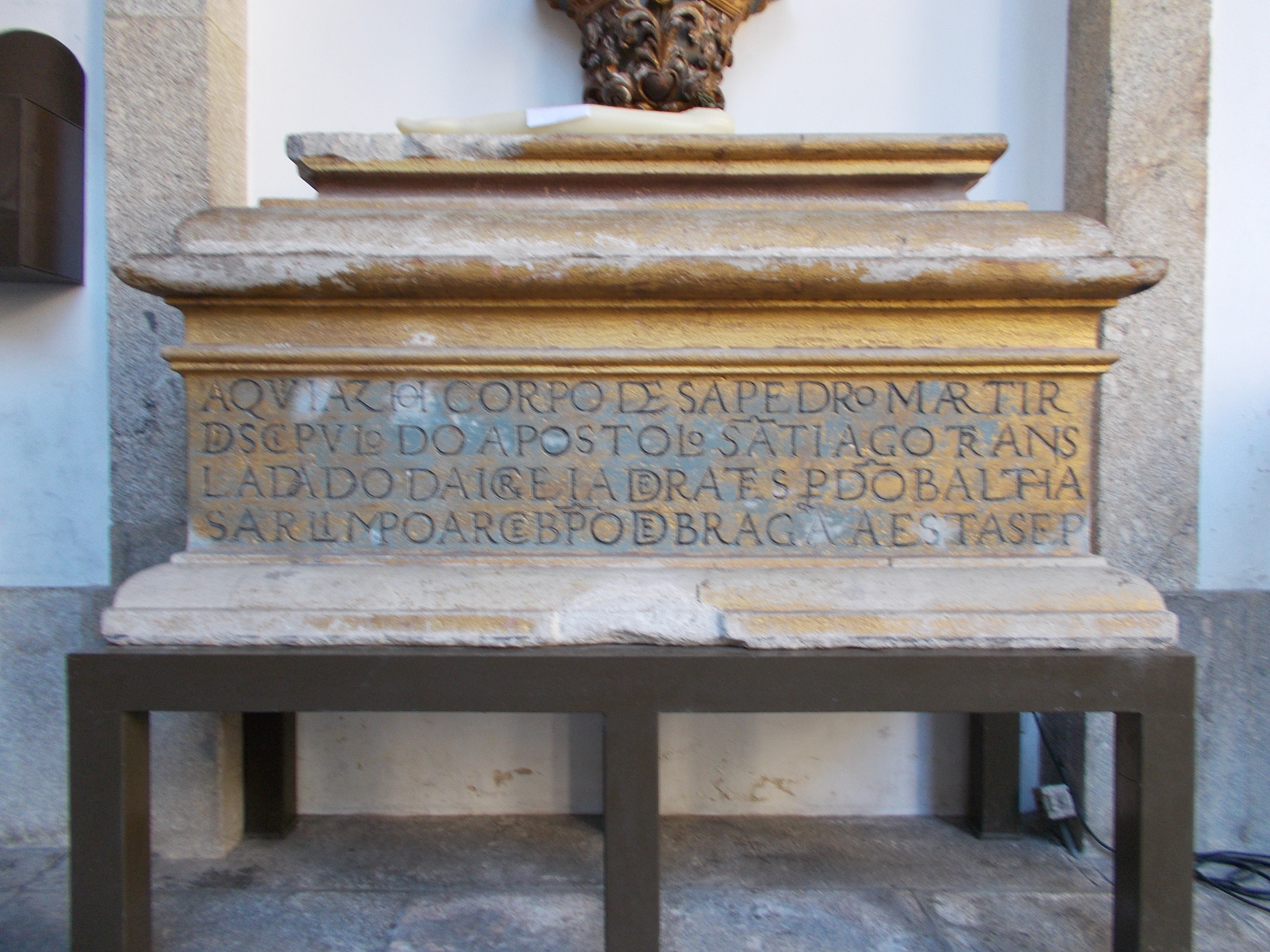
Saint Peter of Rates, in Braga Cathedral

== Miraculous fountains ==
In the civil parishes of Balasar and Rates in Póvoa de Varzim, there are two fountains that the population believes are miraculous because they were used by Peter.

In the 18th century, there are descriptions that Peter of Rates was beheaded while drinking the waters of the fountain in Balasar. The population believes that two indentations on the fountain are impressions from his knees. At the fountain of Rates, a stone is believed to cure in cases of sterility. Due to that belief, on 26 April every year, the feast day of Saint Peter of Rates, the pregnant women and female animals do not work in some villages.

== See also ==
- Monastery of Rates
