= Felix the Hermit =

Portuguese hermit and saint

Saint Felix the Hermit
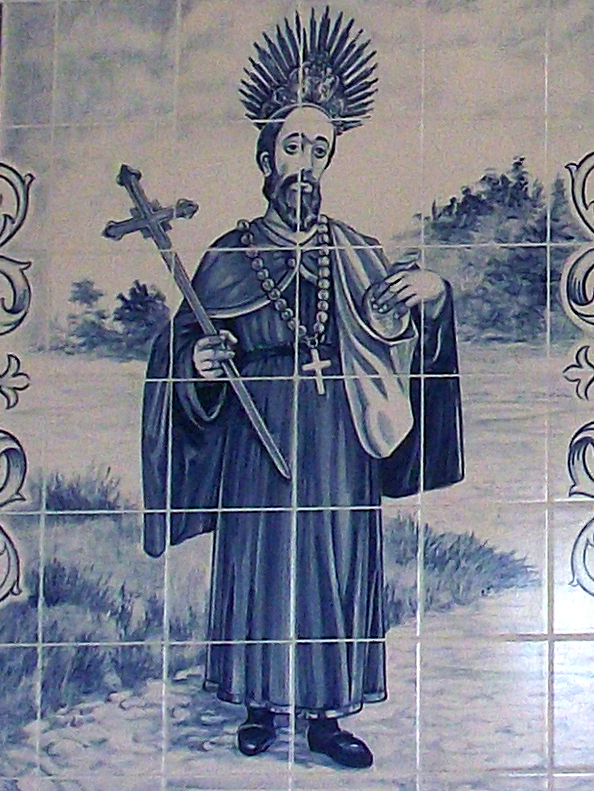

Hermit
- Born: unknown Villa Mendo
- Died: 9th century Mount São Félix
- Venerated in: Roman Catholic Church; Eastern Orthodox Church
- Feast: First Sunday of September

Saint Felix the Hermit (Portuguese: São Félix o Eremita) was a 9th-century fisherman and hermit, who is venerated as a saint in Portugal.

== Legend ==
Felix was from Villa Mendo, an actual ancient Roman villa that existed until the early years of the Kingdom of Portugal and rediscovered in the 20th century, having been buried under sand dunes in Póvoa de Varzim, Portugal.

Felix could catch no fish, says the local legend, which infuriated his parents. Therefore, he left home and settled on the biggest hill of the area, which is today known as Mount São Félix. During the Middle Ages, the hill was known as Monte Lanudos.

With some frequency, Felix observed a light in the darkness of the night from the hill. One day, curious, he went to investigate and discovered the body of Saint Peter of Rates. He took the body, and in that place, the Romanesque church of Saint Peter of Rates was built. The relics of Saint Peter were kept there up until 1552; in that year the body was transferred to Braga Cathedral, where it is still kept.

== Veneration ==
Saint Felix has a church on the top of São Félix Hill, and his feast is celebrated on the first Sunday of September in the parish of Laundos, where the mountain is located in Póvoa de Varzim.
