= Cividade de Terroso =

Ancient city in northern Portugal

Coordinates: 41°24′45″N 8°43′14″W

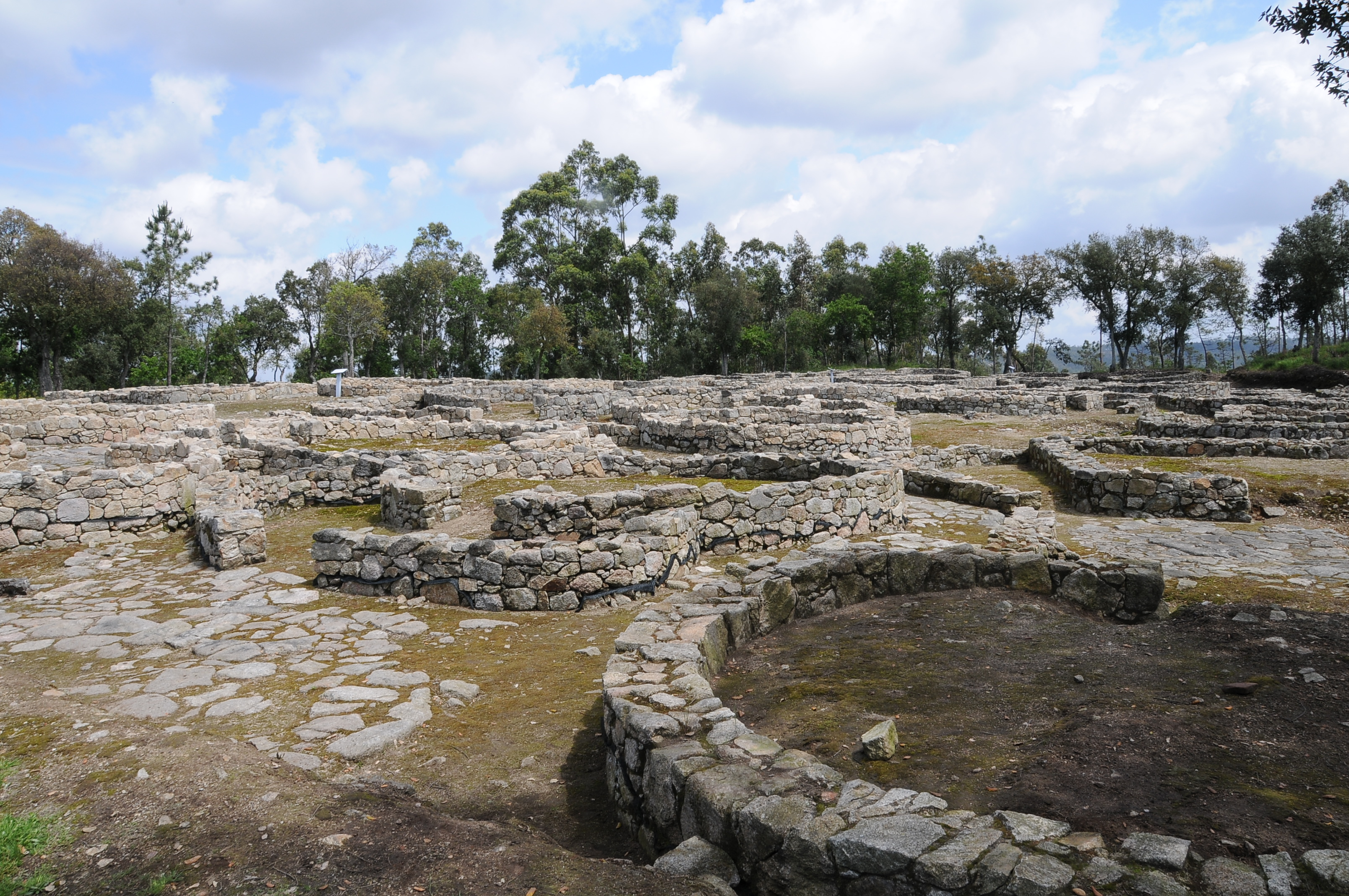
Present day ruins of Cividade. The city's fall was the basis of the book Uma Deusa na Bruma (A Goddess in the Mist) by João Aguiar.

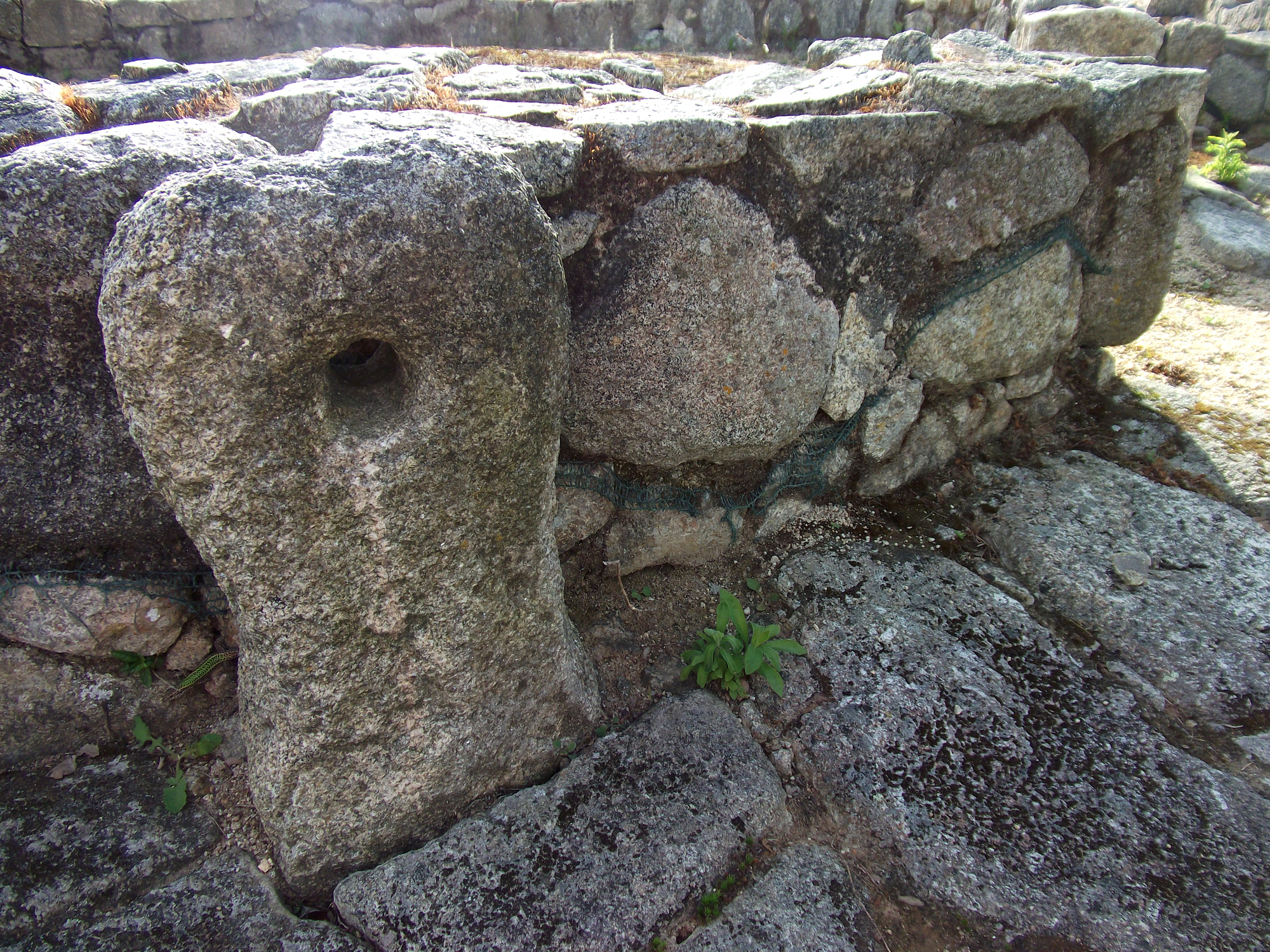
A stone placed in the entrance of a house.

Cividade de Terroso was an ancient city of the Castro culture in North-western coast of the Iberian Peninsula, situated near the present bed of the Ave river, in the suburbs of present-day Póvoa de Varzim, Portugal.

Located, in the heart of the Castro region, the cividade played a leading role in the early urbanization of the region in the early 1st millennium BC, as one of the oldest, largest and impregnable castro settlements. It was important in coastal trading as it was part of well-established maritime trade routes with the Mediterranean. Celtic and later Carthaginian influence was well-known, it was eventually destroyed after the Roman conquest in 138 BC. The city's ancient name is not known with certainty but it was known during the Middle Ages as Civitas Teroso (The City of Terroso). It was built at the summit of Cividade Hill, in the suburban area of Terroso, less than 5 km from the coast, near the eastern edge of modern Póvoa de Varzim.

Beyond the main citadel, three of Cividade de Terroso's outposts are known: Castro de Laundos (the citadel's surveillance post), Castro de Navais (away from the citadel, a fountain remains to this day), and Castro de Argivai (a Castro culture farmhouse in the coastal plain). Cividade de Terroso is located just 6,3 km from Cividade de Bagunte both in the North bank of the Ave river.

== History ==
=== Settlement ===
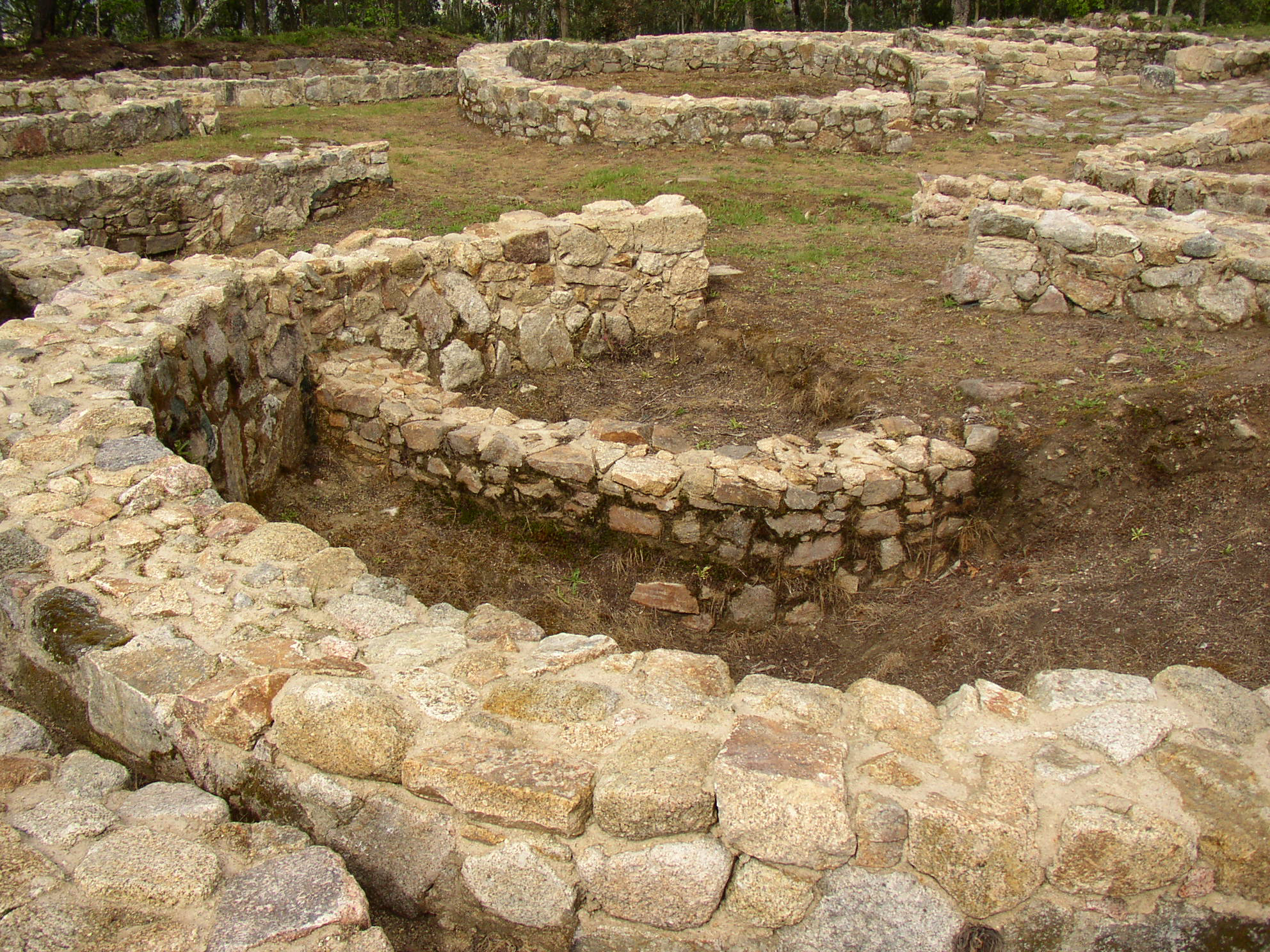
Citadel's ruins.

The settlement of Cividade de Terroso was founded during the Bronze Age, between 800 and 900 BC, as a result of the displacement of the people inhabiting the fertile plain of Beiriz and Várzea in Póvoa de Varzim. This data is supported by the discovery of egg-shaped cesspits, excavated in 1981 by Armando Coelho, where he collected fragments of four vases of the earlier period prior to the settlement of the Cividade. As such, it is part of the oldest Castro culture settlements, such as the ones from Santa Luzia or Roriz.

The city prospered due to its strong defensive walls and its location near the ocean, which facilitated trade with the maritime civilizations of the Mediterranean Sea, mainly during the Carthaginian rule in the South-eastern Iberian Peninsula.

=== Viriatus murdered and Revenge ===
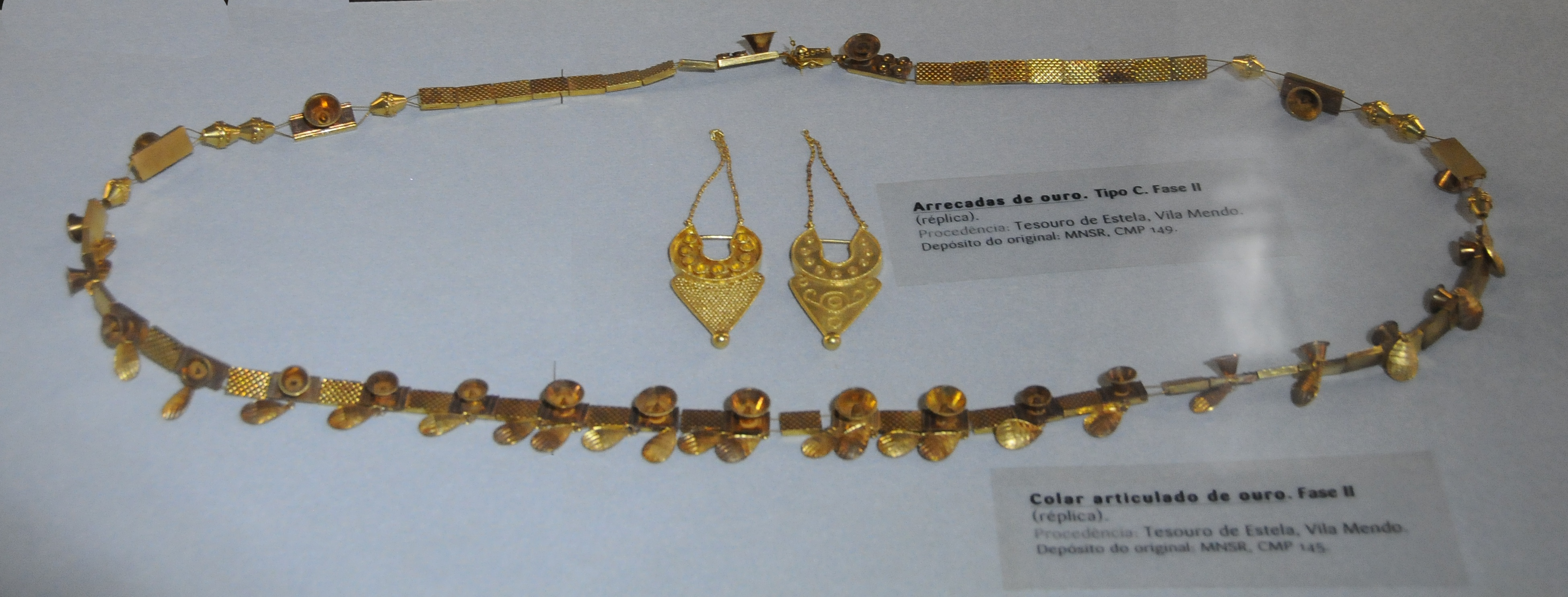
Aqualata mines are the probable source of several Castro culture jewels, including the Treasure of Villa Mendo (replica pictured) and Laundos Earrings.

Trade eventually attracted Roman attention during the Punic Wars and the Romans had learned of the wealth of the Castro region in gold and tin. Viriathus led the troops of the Lusitanian confederation, which included several tribes, and hindered the northward growth of the Roman Republic at the Douro iver, but his murder in 138 BC opened the way for the Roman legions. The citadel and the Castro culture perished at the end of the Lusitanian War. Some of Viriatus fighters may have sought refuge in the North. These with Grovii and Callacian tribes and following Celtic ways, with their women, wanted revenge for the death of Viriatus. They attacked the Roman settlements in Lusitania, gaining momentum with the support of other tribes along the way, reaching the south of the Peninsula, near modern Andalusia. Endangering Roman rule in large stretches of Hispania.

=== Roman conquest ===
Decimus Junius Brutus was sent to the Roman province of Hispania Ulterior to deal with it and led a campaign in order to annex the Castro region (of the Callaeci tribes) for Rome, which led to the complete destruction of the city, just after the death of Viriathus. Strabo wrote, probably describing this period: "until they were stopped by the Romans, who humiliated them and reduced most of their cities to mere villages" (Strabo, III.3.5). These cities included Abobriga, Lambriaca and Catania. Lambriaca allied with Rome but rebelled following regional pressure as they were perceived as traitors in the region. It led the rebellion but after months of siege, it asked for mercy as the siege left the city without provision of supplies. All of coast was occupied by the Celts. In Conventus Bracarensis, where the Romans would establish the Augustan citadel of Bracara, there were also the Grovii and the Heleni of Greek origin. The Grovii dwelt on the coast near the rivers "Avo" (the Ave river), Celadus, Nebis, Minius and the Oblivion. The Laeros and the Ulla rivers were in the North reach of this people. The notable citadel of Abobriga or Avobriga, was probably located near the mouth of the Ave River, as its name suggests. According to Pomponius Mela, it was located near Lambriaca, in the lands of the Grovii. A hint which could help to identify Celtic Lambriaca is that it had two areas with cliffs and very easy access from the other two sides.

The important city of Cinania was rich, its inhabitants had several Luxury goods but kept their independence due to the city's strong defensive walls and despise for Rome. Brutus wished to conquer it before leaving Iberia and not leave that conquest for other officials. He planned a siege. The Romans used catapults to destroy the city's walls and invade the citadel, but the inhabitants resisted the attempted Roman assaults, causing Roman casualties. The Romans had to withdraw. The Cinanians used a tunnel, used for mining, for a surprise assault on the Roman camp destroying the catapults. Nonetheless, Appian mentioned two battles led by Brutus, in which women fought alongside the men, both ended in a Roman victory. Archaeological data in Cividade de Terroso and tribesmen's Last Stand behavior, which included their children in one of those battles, highlight the barbarity of the conquest.

=== The last urban stage under the Roman mercy policy ===
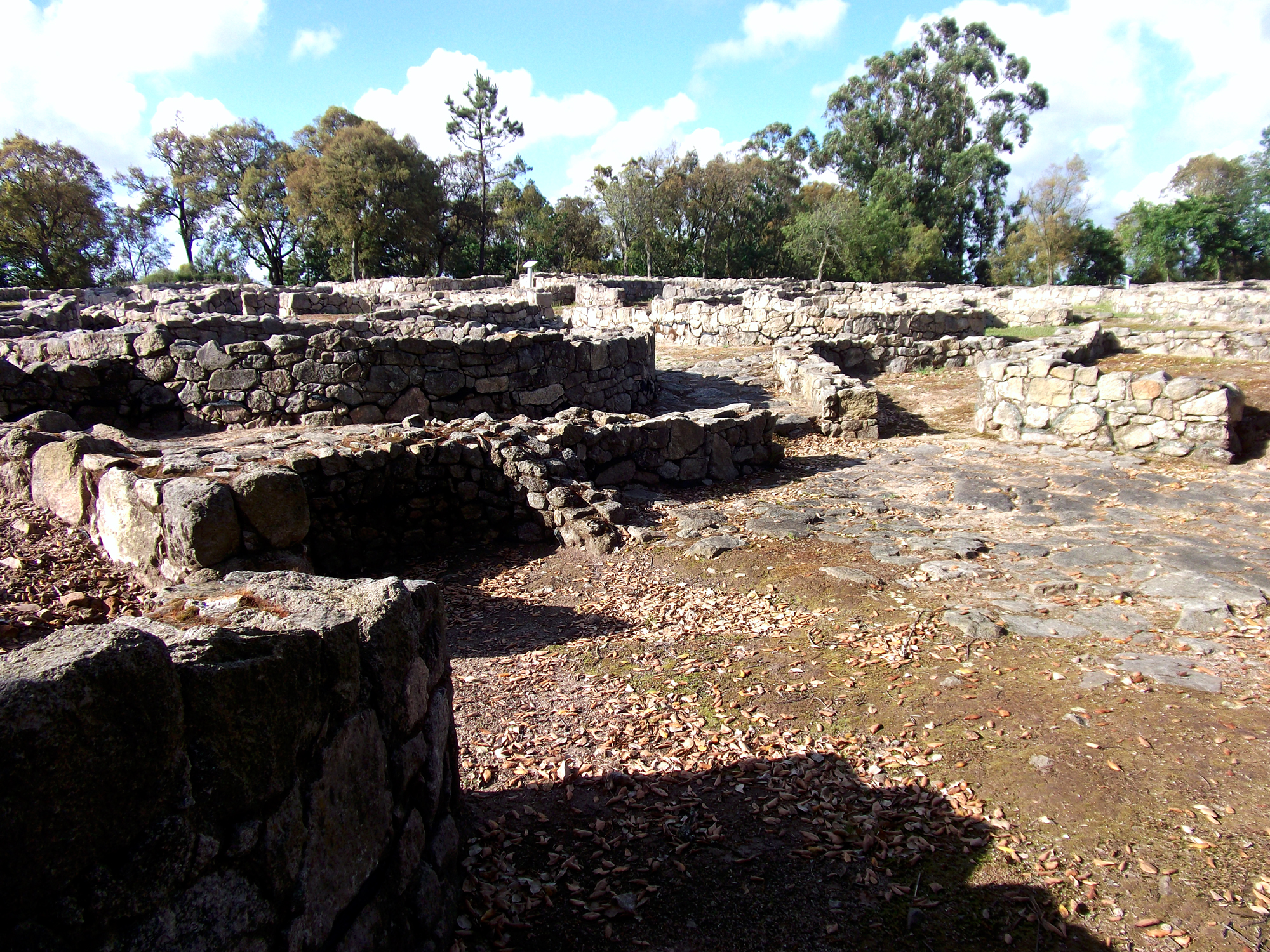
Building probably dating to the Roman period.

Roman mercy is recorded by the establishment of Brutus's peaceful settlements. Sometime later, the Cividade was rebuilt and became heavily Romanized, which started the cividade's last urban stage. Upon return, Brutus gained an honorific Callaecus on the fifth day before the Ides, the festival of Vesta in the month of Junius. A celebrated milestone refers that Brutus victories extended to the ocean. Brutus is also referred by Plutarch as "the Brutus who triumphed over Lusitania" and as the invader of Lusitania.

=== Citadel exodus ===
The region was incorporated in the Roman Empire and totally pacified during the rule of Caesar Augustus. In the coastal plain, a Roman villa that was known as Villa Euracini was created, hence it was a property of a family known as the Euracini. The family was joined by Castro people who returned to the coastal plain. An early fish factory and salt evaporation ponds were built near the new villa, and a later one with a cetariæ and a housing complex, with one of those buildings dating to the 1st century. The Romans built roads, including Via Veteris, a necropolis and exploited the famed local mines, that became known as Aqualata. From the 1st century onward, and during the imperial period, the slow abandonment of Cividade Hill started.

=== An 18th century legendary city ===
In the Memórias Paroquiais (Parish Memories) of 1758, the director António Fernandes da Loba with other clergymen from the parish of Terroso, wrote: This parish is all surrounded by farming fields, and in one area, almost in the middle of it, there is a higher hill, that is about a third of the farming fields of this parish and the ancient say that this was the City of Moors Hill, because it is known as Cividade Hill.

The Lieutenant Veiga Leal in the News of Póvoa de Varzim on May 24 of 1758 wrote: "From the hill known as Cividade, one can see several hints of houses, that the people say formed a city, cars with bricks from the ruins of that one arrive in this town."

=== 20th century archaeology ===
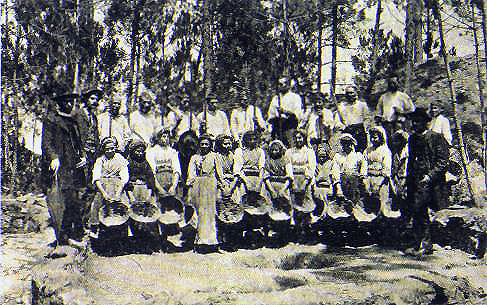
Group of workers who made the excavations in 1906 in Cividade.

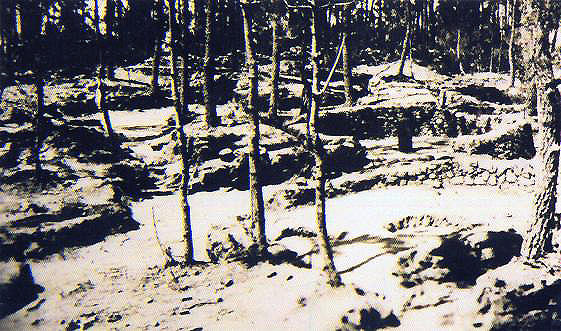
Cividade de Terroso during the first archaeology works in 1906.

Cividade was later rarely cited by other authors. In the early 20th century, Rocha Peixoto encouraged his friend António dos Santos Graça to subsidize archaeology works.

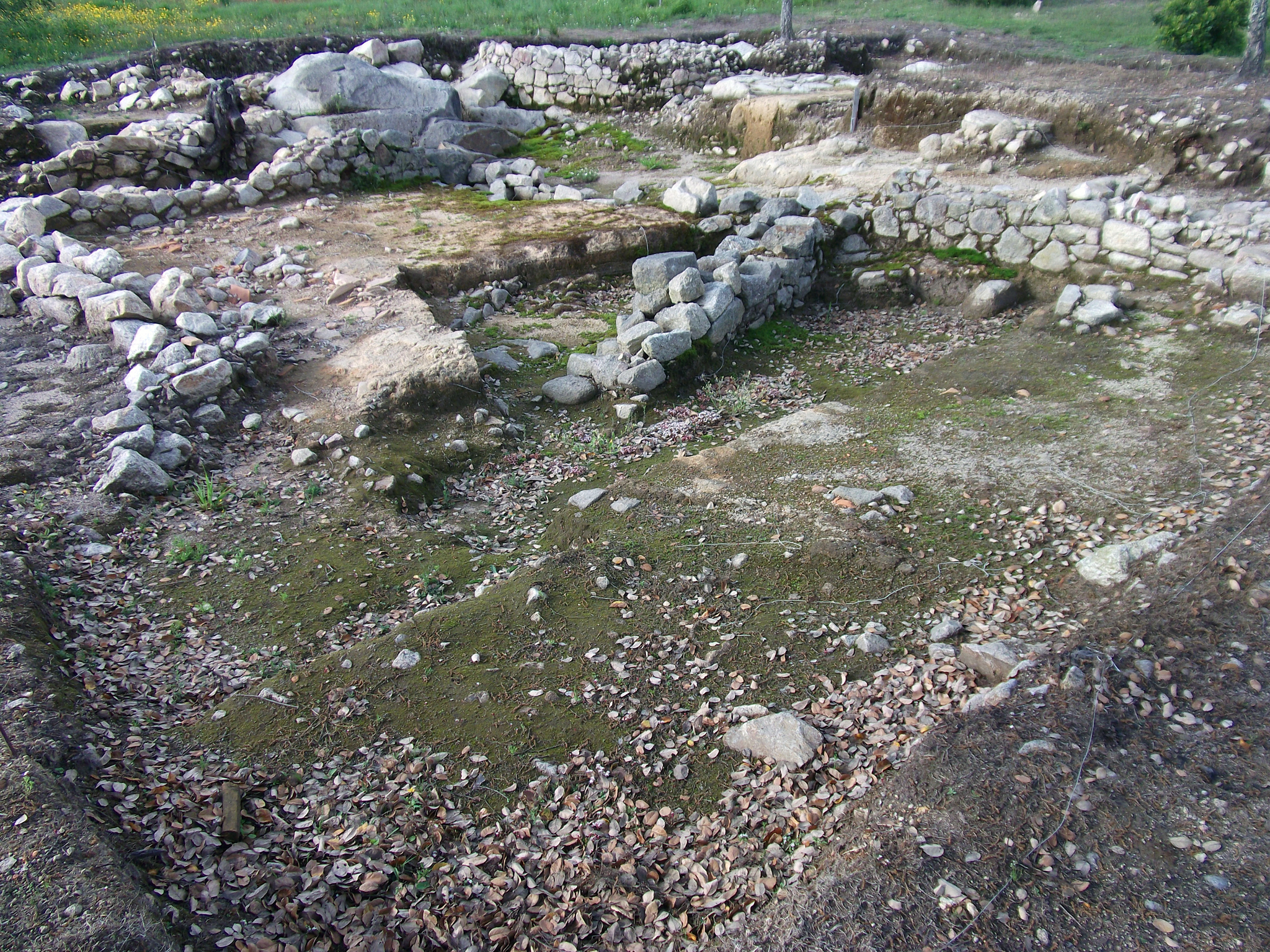
Outside the acropolis, modern archaeological surveys revealed more buildings.

In 1906, excavations began on June 5 with 25 manual workers and continued until October, interrupted due to bad weather; they recommenced in May 1907, finishing in that same year. The materials discovered were taken to museums in the city of Porto.

After the death of Rocha Peixoto, in 1909, some rocks of the citadel had been used to pave some streets in Póvoa de Varzim, notably Rua Santos Minho Street and Rua das Hortas. Occasionally, groups of scouts of the Portuguese Youth and others in the decades of the 1950s and 1960s, made diggings in search for archaeology pieces. This was seen as archaeological vandalism but continued even after the Cividade was listed as a property of Public Interest in 1961.

In 1980, Póvoa de Varzim City Hall invited Armando Coelho to pursue further archaeology works; these took place during the summer of that year. Result were used for Coelho's project A Cultura Castreja do Norte de Portugal. Archaeological surveys led by the same archaeologist resumed in 1981, leading to the discovery of a grave and tombstones, which helped to comprehend the funerary rituals; housing, yards and walls were also surveyed, which were the main focus for the 1982 archaeological surveys along with the recovery of Decumanus street (East-west). Archaeology works resumed in 1989 and 1991. The city hall purchased the acropolis area and constructed a small archaeological museum in its entrance.

In 2005, groups of Portuguese and Spanish (Galician) archaeologists had started to study the hypothesis of this cividade and six others to be classified as World Heritage sites of UNESCO. The Rede de Castros do Noroeste, the Northwestern Castro Network, was established in 2015 grouping the most important sites in Northern Portugal including Cividade de Terroso but also Cividade de Bagunte, Citânia de Sanfins, Citânia de Briteiros, Citânia de Santa Lúzia and a few other sites.

== Defensive system ==
The most typical characteristic of the castros is its defensive system. The inhabitants had chosen to start living in the hill as a way of protection against attacks and lootings by rival tribes. The Cividade was erected at 152 metres height (about 500 feet), allowing an excellent position to monitor the entire region. One of the sides, the north, was blocked by São Félix Hill, where a smaller castro was built, the Castro de Laundos from the 2nd century B.C., that served as a surveillance post.

The migrations of Turduli and Celtici proceeding from the south of the Iberian Peninsula heading north are referred by Strabo and were the reason for the improvement of the defensive systems of the castros around 500 BC.

Cividade de Terroso is one of the most heavily defensive Castro culture citadels, given that the acropolis was surrounded by three rings of walls. These walls were built at different stages, due to the growth of the town.

The walls had great blocks without mortar and were adapted to the hill's topography. The areas of easier access (South, East and West) possessed high, wide and resistant walls; while the ones in land with steep slopes were protected mainly by strengthening the local features.

That can easily be visible with the discovered structures in the East that present a strong defensive system that reaches 5.30 metres (17 feet 5 inches) wide. While in the Northeast, the wall was constructed using natural granite that only was crowned by a wall of rocks.

The entrance that interrupted the wall was paved with flagstone with about 1.70 metres (5 feet 7 inches) of width. The defensive perimeter seems to include a ditch of about 1 metre (3 feet 3 inches) of depth and width in base of the hill, as it was detected while a house was being built in the north of the hill.

Defensive system

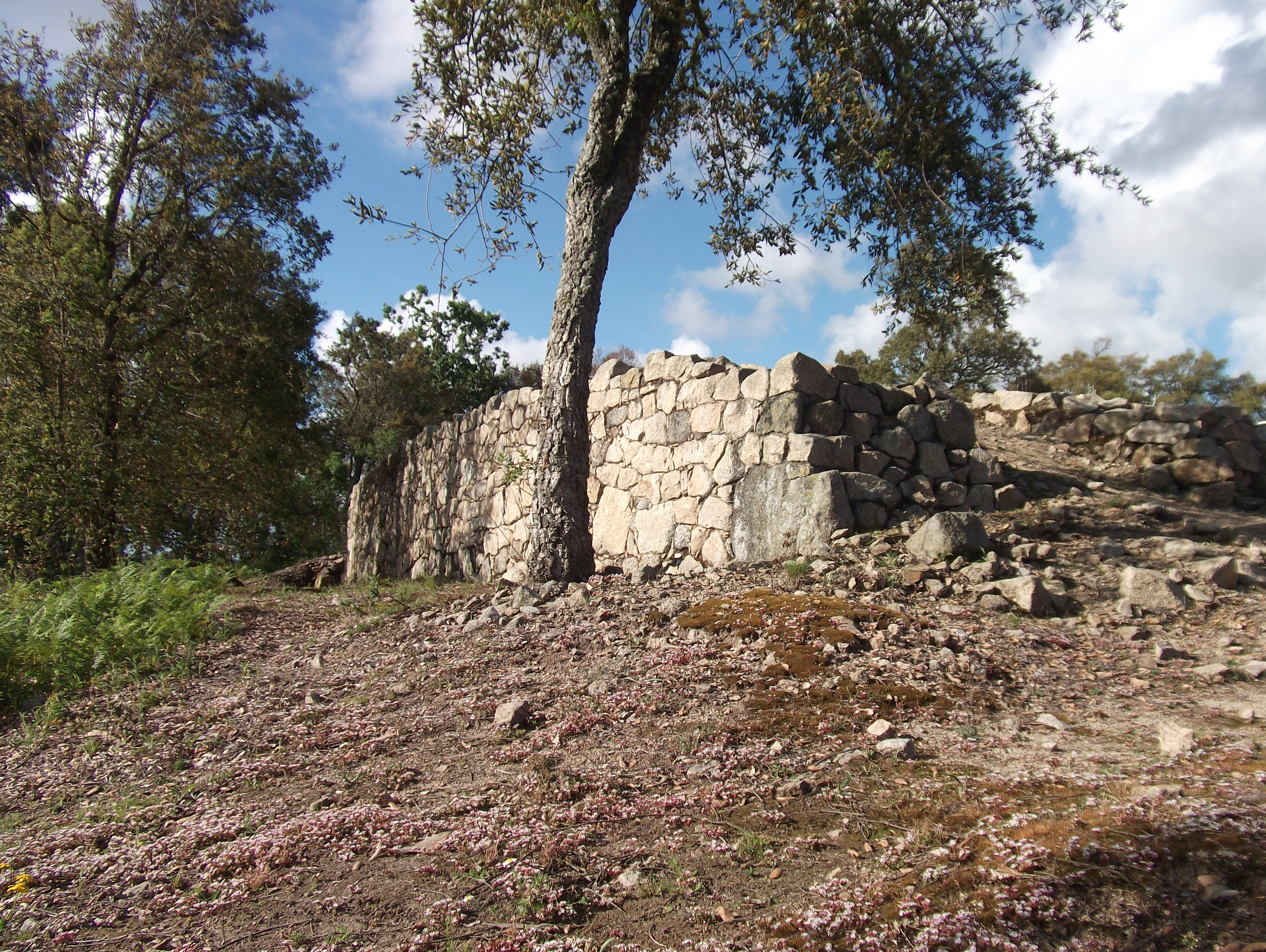
Remains of a high, wide and resistant wall

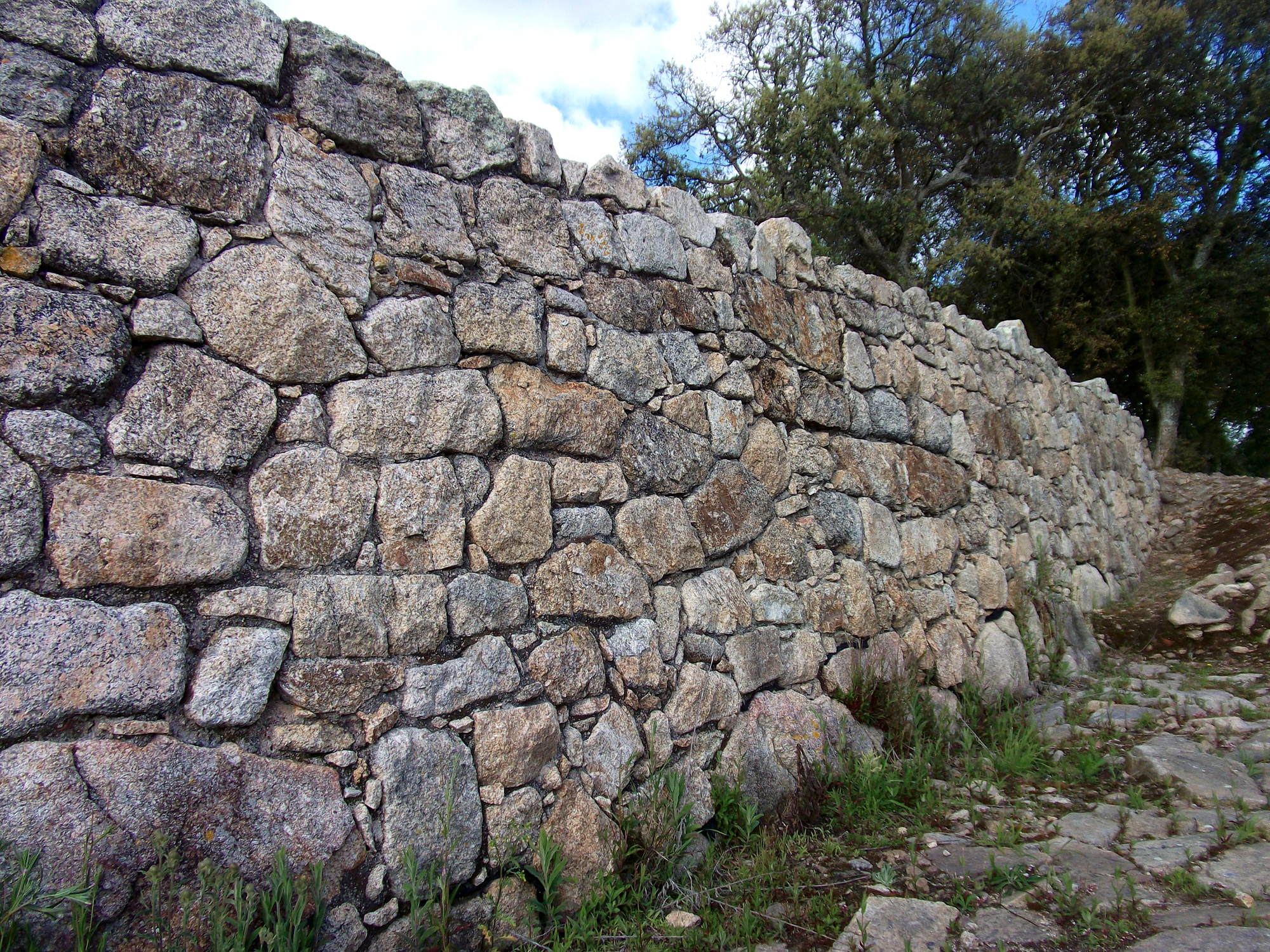
Ruins of one of the city walls

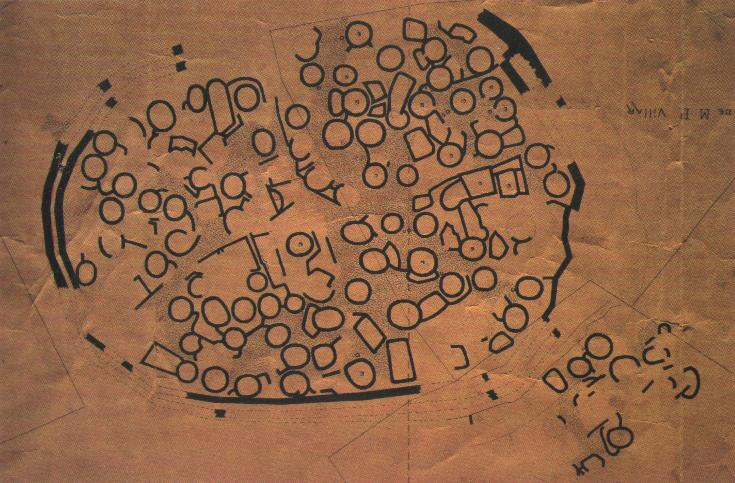
The first map of the town made during the archaeological works in 1906

== Urban structure ==
The acropolis was surrounded by three rings of walls, and within those walls, diverse types of buildings existed, including funerary enclosures, which are extremely rare in the Castro culture world. At its peak, the acropolis had 12 hectares (30 acres) and was inhabited by several hundred people.

In the archaeological works carried through the beginning of the 20th century, the Cividade seemed to have a disorganized structure, but more recent data suggests instead an organization whose characteristics stem from older levels of occupation, which had been ignored during the first archaeological works.

Each quadrant of the town is divided into family nuclei around a private square, which are almost always paved with flagstone. Some houses possessed a forecourt.

=== Stages ===
The Cividade had urbanization stages. Archeologists identified three stages: An early settlement stage with huts (8th-9th century — 5th century BC), a second stage characterized by urbanization and fortification with robust stonework (5th century — 2nd century BC) and a Roman period stage (2nd century BC — 1st century AD).

During the early centuries, small habitations were built with vegetable elements mixed with adobe. The first stonework started in the 5th century B.C., this became possible due to the iron peaks technology. A technology that was only available in Asia Minor, but that was brought to the Iberian Peninsula by Phoenician settlers in the Atlantic Coast during the 8th and 7th centuries B.C.

Buildings during this period are, characteristically, circular with diameters between 4 and 5 meters and with walls 30 to 40 cm thick. The granite rocks were fractured or splintered, and placed in two lines, with the smoothest part heading for the exterior and interior of the house. The space between the two rocks was filled with small rocks and mortar of large sand grains creating robust walls.

In the last stage, the Roman one (starting in 138 – 136 B.C.), following the destruction by Decimus Junius Brutus, there is an urban reorganization with use of the new building techniques and changes in shapes and sizes. Quadrangular structures started appearing, replacing the typical Castro culture circular architecture. The roof started being made out of "tegula" instead of vegetable material with adobe.

During this stage, stonework used in home construction was quadrangular; the project of two stone alignments remained, but rooms were wider and filled with large sand grains or adobe and rocks of small to average size, resulting in thicker walls with 45–60 cm.

Housing

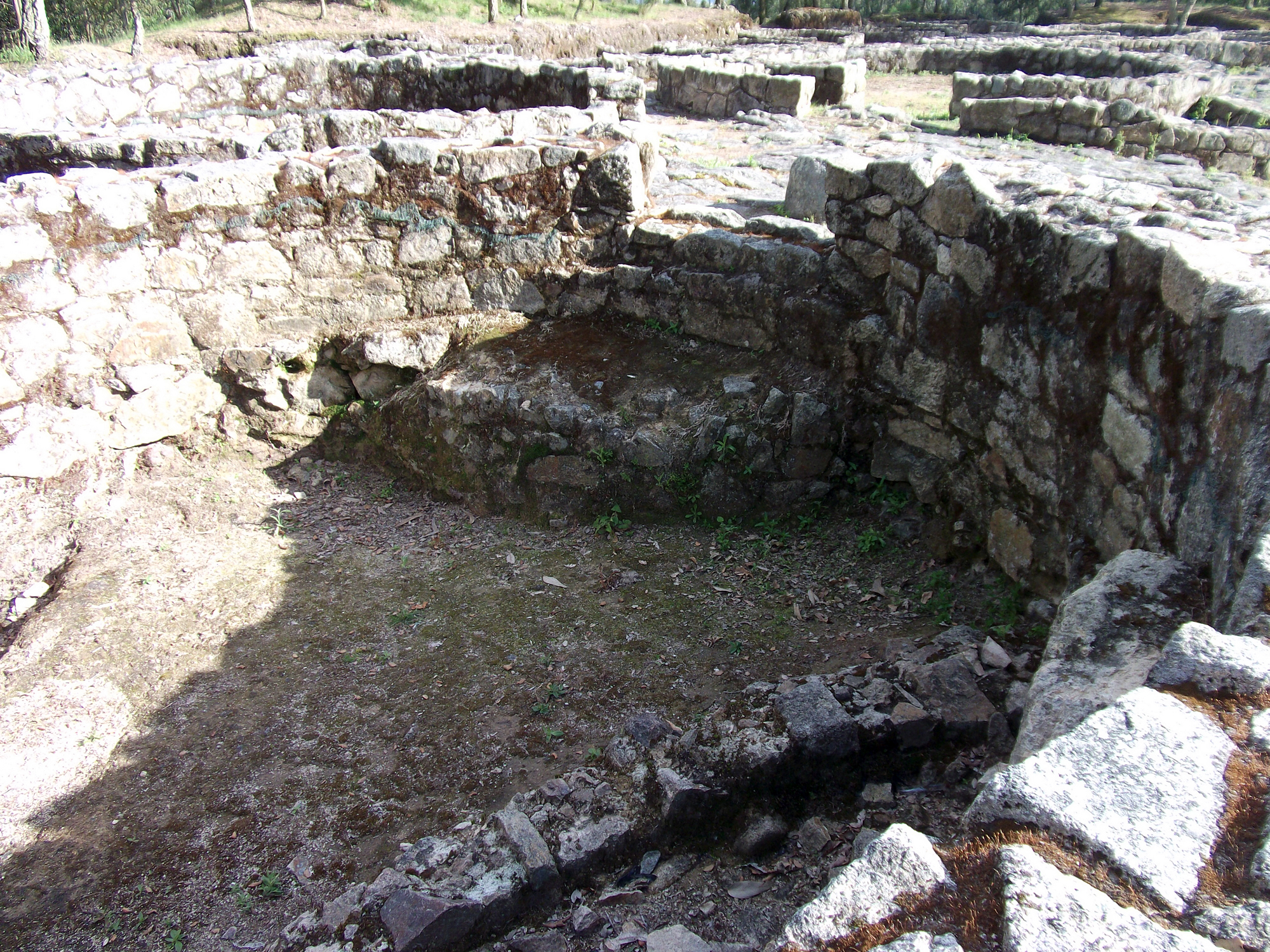
Detectable construction stages during the city's history

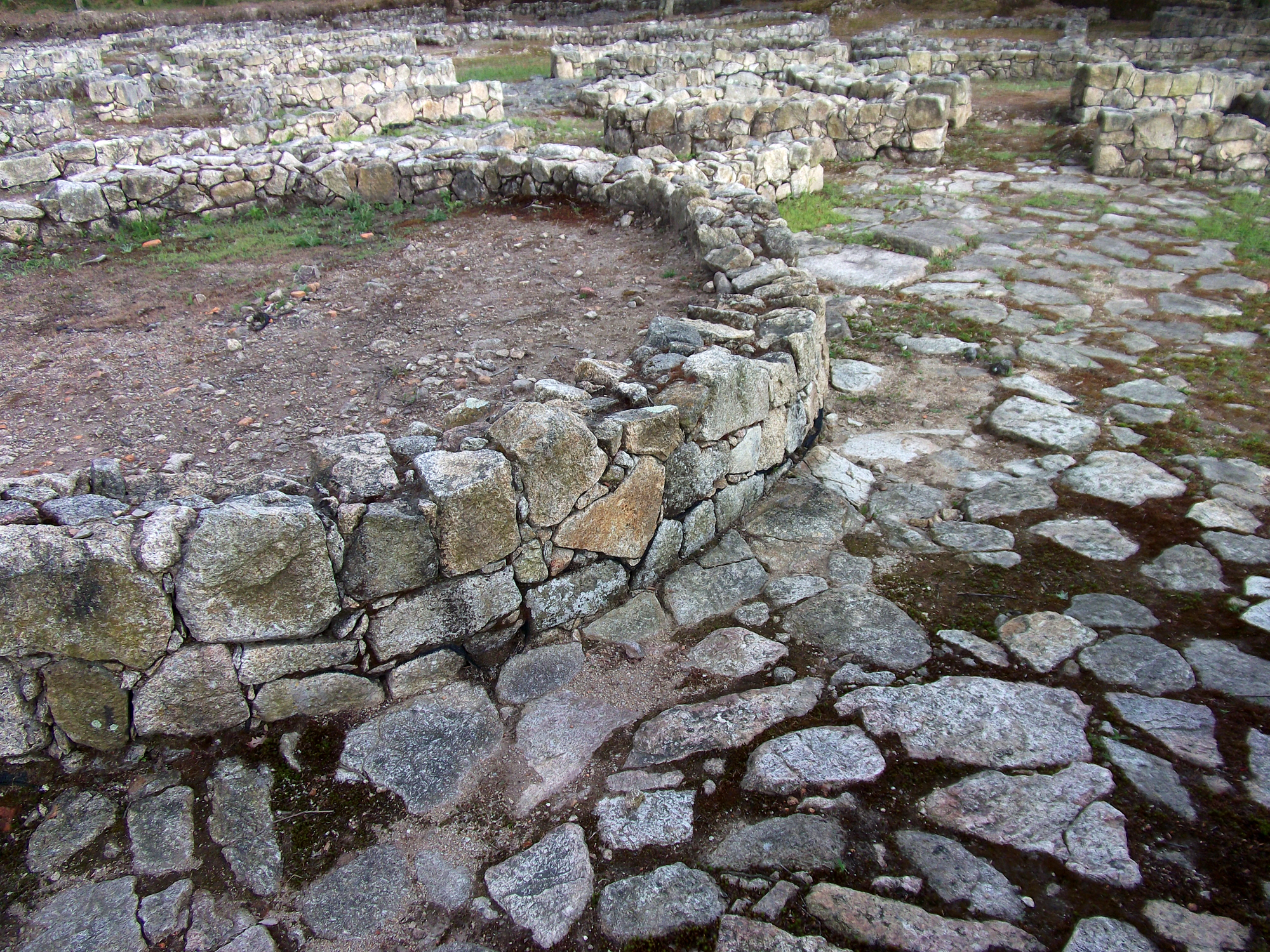
Yard pavement

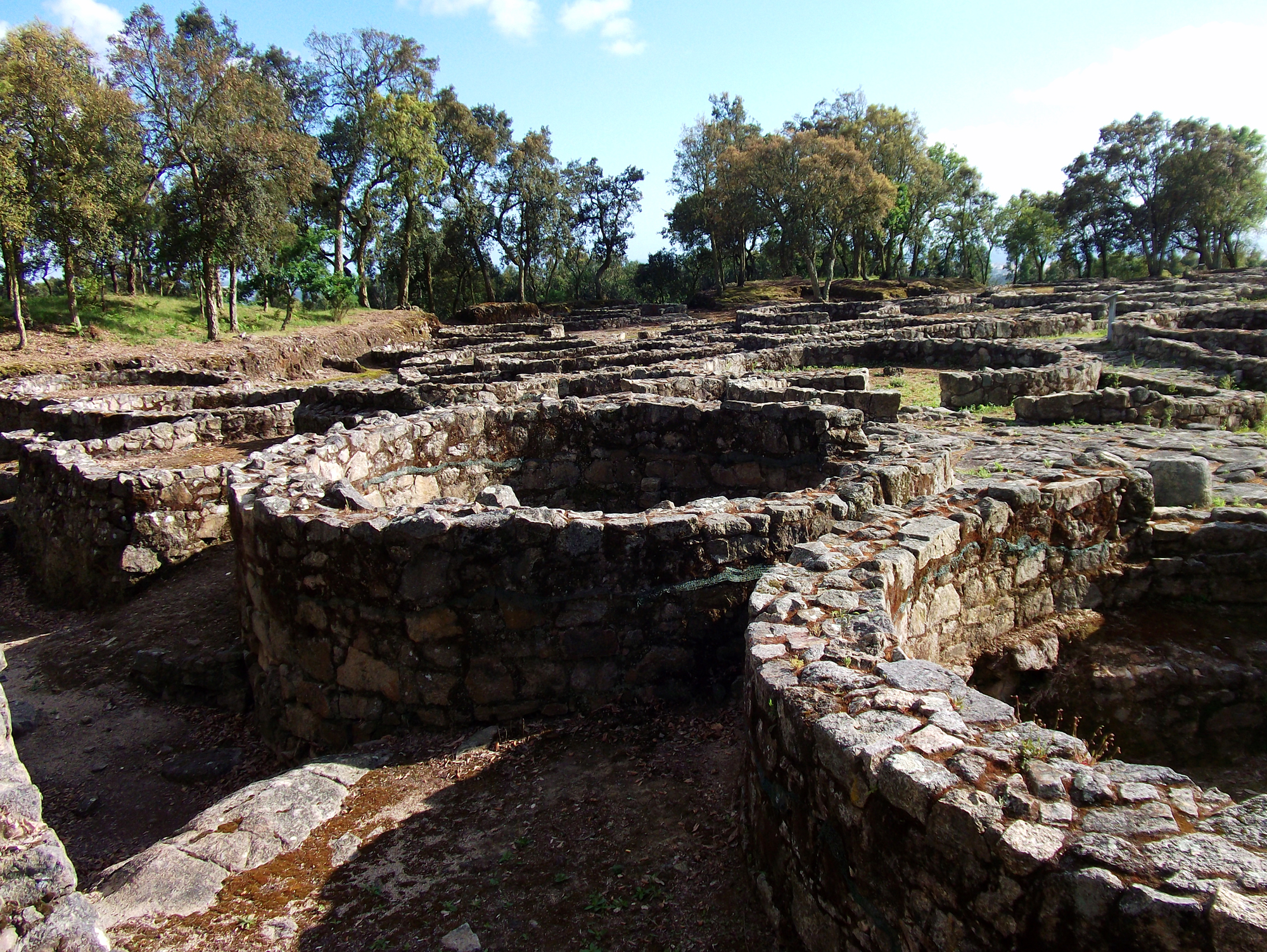
Eastern housing

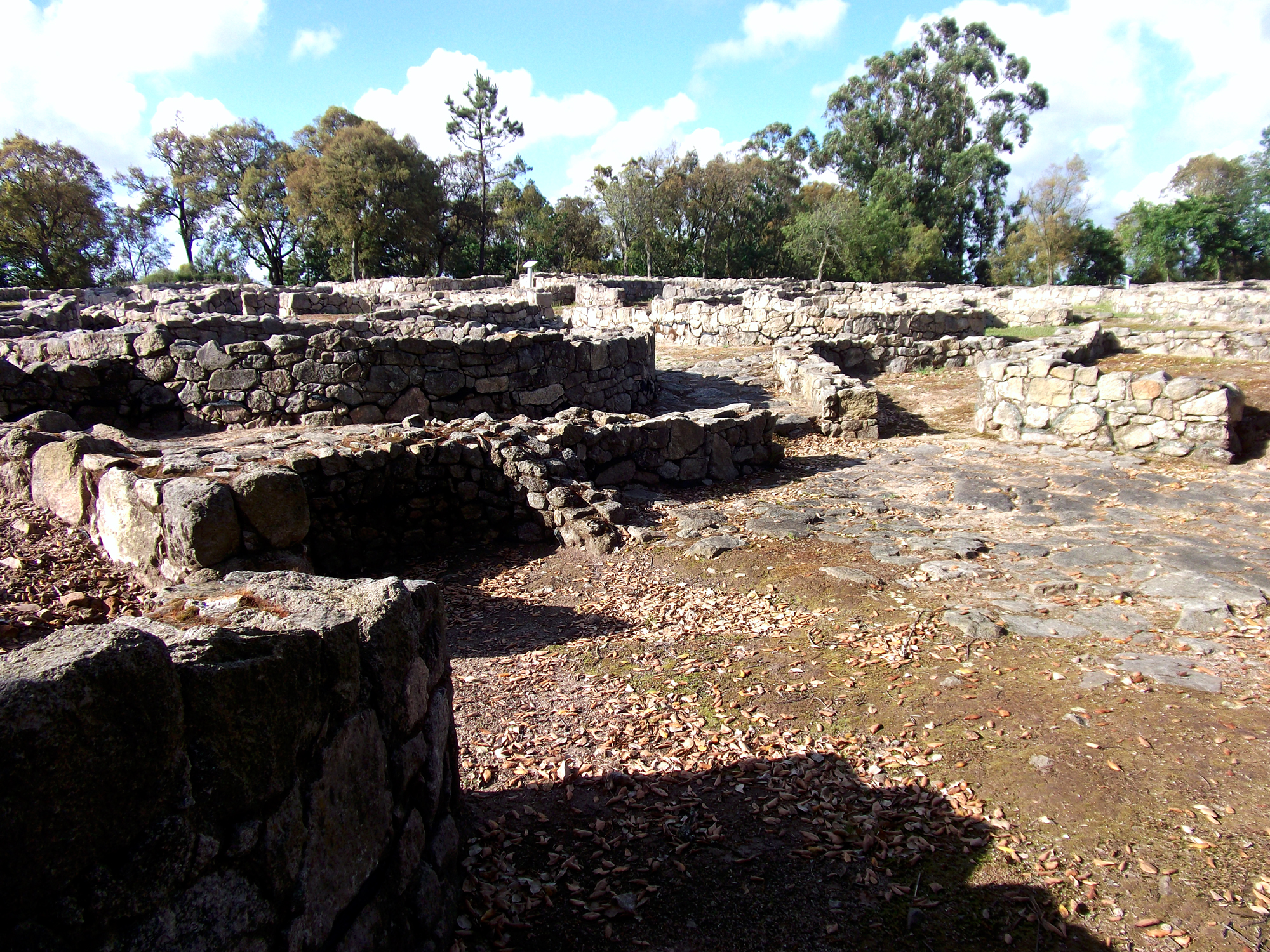
Ruins near the city gates

=== Family settings ===
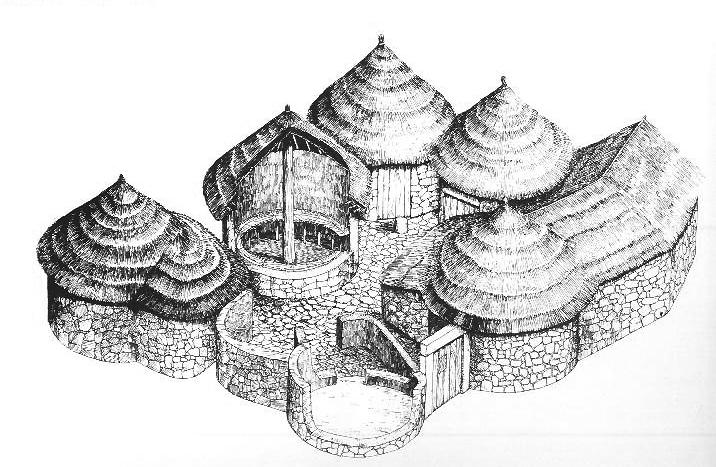
Family housing set.

The family settings, having four or five circular divisions, encircle a flagstone paved yard where the doors of the different divisions converged. These central yards had an important role in family life as the area where the daily family activities took place. These nuclei would be closed by key, granting privacy to families.

The building interiors of the second stage, prior to the Roman period, possessed fine floors made of adobe or large sand-grains. Some of these floors were decorated with rope-styled, wave and circle carvings and motifs, especially in fireplaces. In the Roman-influence stage, these floors had become well-taken care of, being denser and thicker.

=== Streets ===
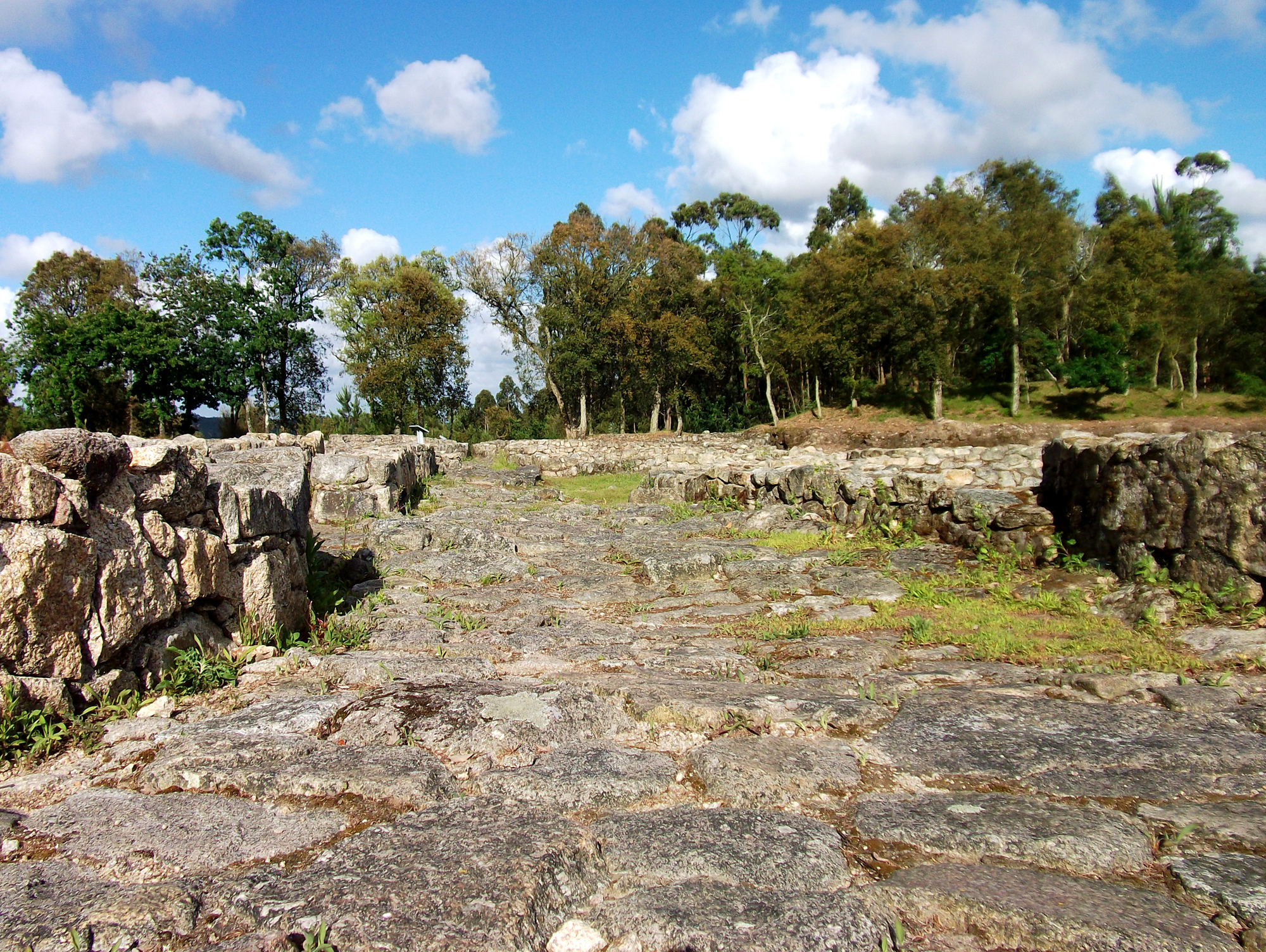
Decumanus street.

The family settings were divided by narrow roads with some public spaces. The two main streets had the typical Roman orientation of the Decumanus and Cardium.

The Decumanus was the city's main avenue that slightly followed the wall to the East for the West and slightly curved for Southwest from the crossroad with the Cardium (North-South street), the later reaches the entrance of the citadel. The exterior access was fulfilled by a slight descending reaching the way that is still used today to enter in the town.

These main roads divided the settlement in four parts. Each one of these parts had four or five family settings.

In some areas of the city, vestiges of sewers or narrow channels had been discovered; these could have been used to channel rain water.

== Culture ==
The population worked in agriculture, namely cereals and horticulture, fishing, recollection, shepherding and worked metals, textiles and ceramics. Cultural influences arrived from the inland Iberian Peninsula, beyond the ones proceeding from the Mediterranean through trade.

The Castro culture is known by having defensive walls in their cities and villages, with circular houses in hilltops and for its characteristic ceramics, widely popular among them. It disappears with the Roman acculturation and the movement of the populations for the coastal plain, where the strong Roman cultural presence, from the 2nd century BC onwards, is visible in the vestiges of Roman villas found there where, currently, the city of the Póvoa de Varzim is located (Old Town of Póvoa de Varzim, Alto de Martim Vaz and Junqueira), and in the parishes of Estela (Villa Mendo) and near the Chapel of Santo André in Aver-o-Mar.

=== Cuisine ===
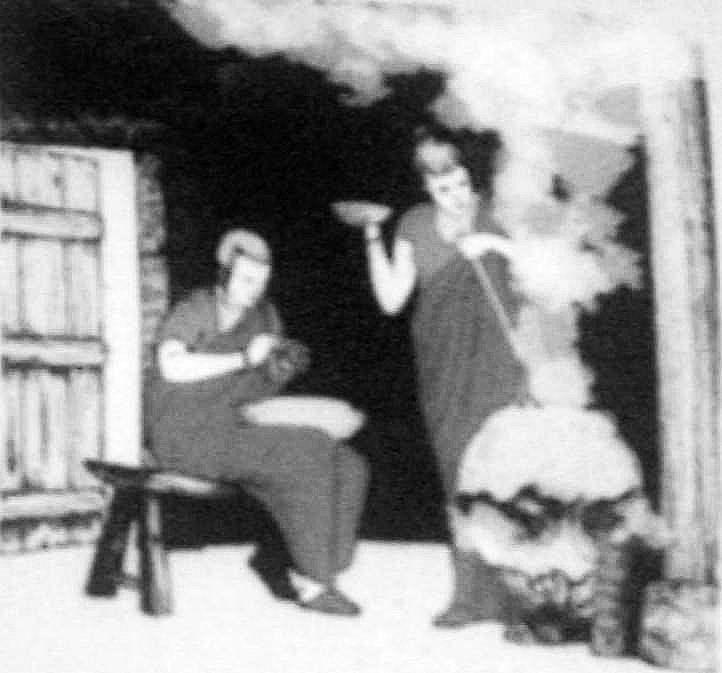
The population lived mainly from agriculture, but they also ate seafood, bread and hunted animals.

The population lived mainly from agriculture, mainly with the culture of cereals such as wheat and barley, and of vegetables (the broadbean) and acorn.

The concheiro found in the Cividade showed that they ate raw or cooked limpets, mussels and Sea urchins. These species are still broadly common. Fishing must not have been a regular activity, given the lack of archaeological evidence, but the discovery of hooks and net weights showed that the Castro people were able to catch fish of considerable size such as grouper and snook.

Barley was farmed to produce a kind of beer, which was nicknamed zythos. Beer was considered a barbaric drink by the Greeks and Romans given the fact that they were accustomed to the subtleness of wine. Acorn was smashed to create a kind of flour.

Pickings wild plants, fruits, seeds and roots complemented the dietary staple; they also ate and picked wild blackberries, dandelion, clovers and even kelps. Some of these vegetables are still used by the local population today. The Romans introduced the consumption of wine and olive oil.

The animals used by the Castro people are confirmed by classical documents and archaeological registers, and included horses, pigs, cows and sheep. There was a cultural taboo against the eating of horses or dogs.

There is little evidence of poultry during the Castro culture period, but during the period of Roman influence it became quite common.

Although there is only fragmentary evidence in the Cividade, hunting must have been a part of everyday life given that classic sources, such as Strabo and Pliny the Elder describe the region as very rich in fauna, including: wild bear, deer, wild boars, foxes, beavers, rabbits, hares and a variety of birds; all of which would have been valuable food sources.

=== Handicrafts ===
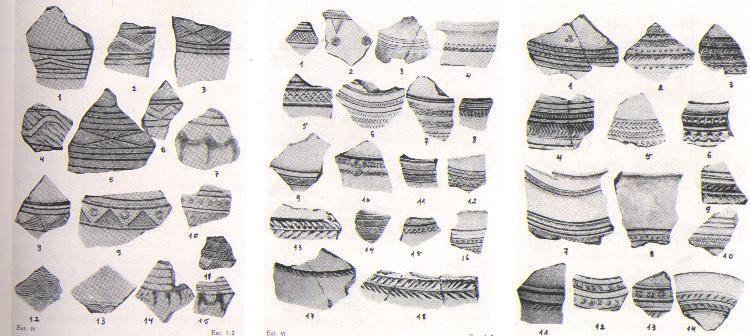
Castro ceramics had many different drawings.

Castro ceramics (goblets and vases) evolved during the ages, from a primitive system to the use of potter's wheels. However, the amphorae and the use of the glass only started to be common with the Romanization. These amphorae, essentially, served for the transport and storage of cereals, fruits, wine and olive oil.

Many of the ceramics found in the Cividade de Terroso had local characteristics. Pottery was seen as a man's work and significant amounts were found with great variety, showing that it was a cheap, important and accessible product.

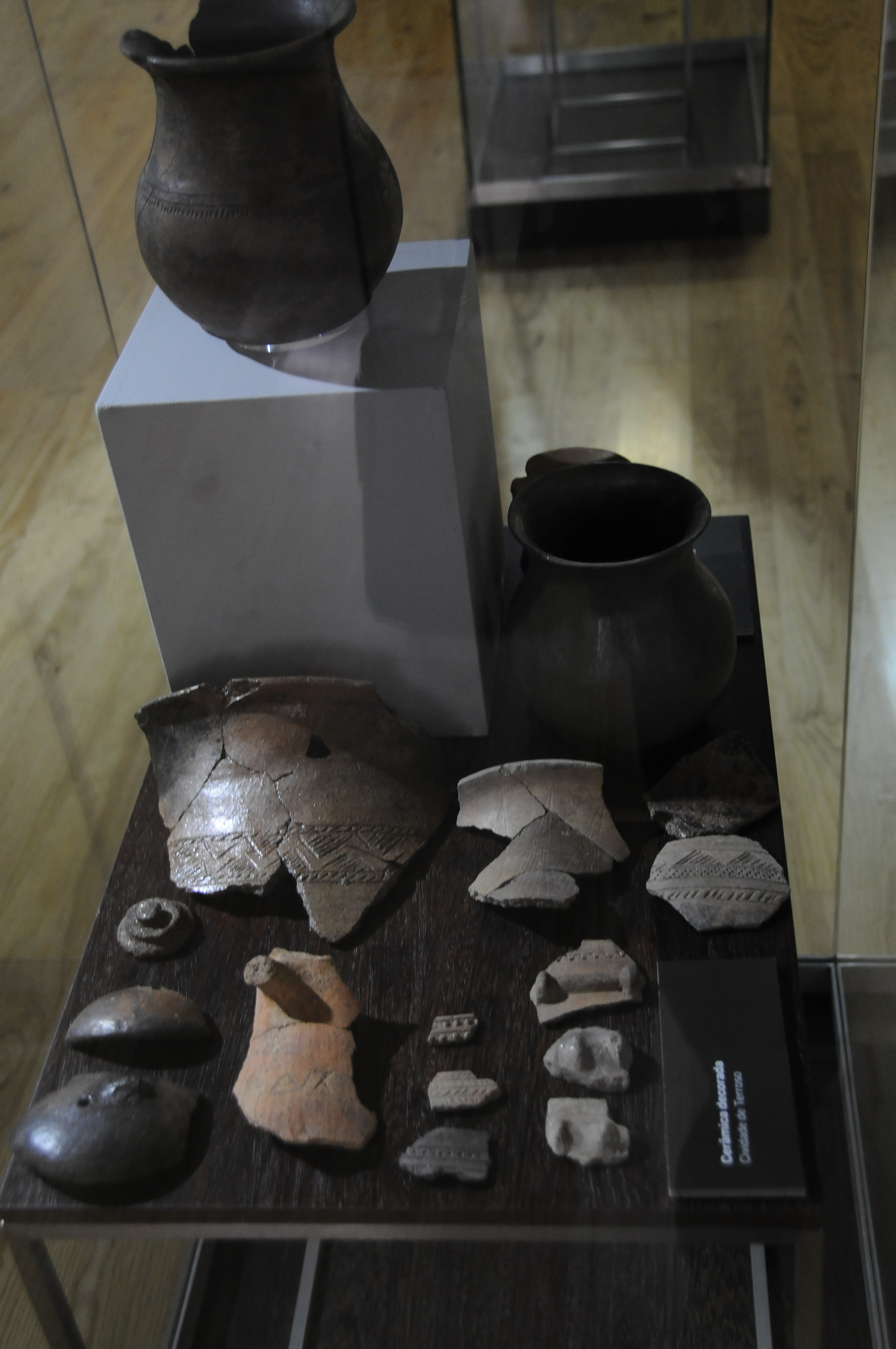
Native pottery.

However, the city's ceramic structure are practically identical to the ones found in other castros of the same period. The decoration of the vases was of the incisive type (decoration cut into the clay before firing), but scapulae and impressed vases also existed; adobe lace, in rope form, with or without incisions are also found.

Drawings in "S", assigned as palmípedes, are frequently found in engraved vases, these could be printed with other printed or engraved drawings. Other decorative forms, that can appear mixed and with diverse techniques, include circles, triangles, semicircles, lines, in zig-zag, in a total of about two hundred of different kinds of drawings.

Weaving was sufficiently generalized and was seen as a woman's duty and was also progressing, especially during the Roman period; some weights of sewing press were found and sets of ten of cossoiros. The discovery of shears strengthened the idea of the systematic breeding of sheep to use their wool.

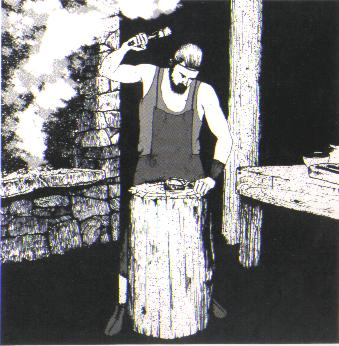
Metallurgy in Cividade de Terroso.

Numerous vestiges of metallurgic activities had been detected and great amounts of casting slags, fibulae, fragmented iron objects and other metals remains were discovered, mostly lead, copper/bronze, tin and perhaps gold. Gatos (for repairing ceramics), pins, fibulae, stili and needles in copper or bronze, demonstrating that the work in copper and its alloys was one of the most common activities of the town. The iron was used for many every-day objects, some nails were found, but also hooks and a tip of a scythe or dagger.

Near the door of the wall (in the southwest of the city) a workshop was identified, given that in the place some vestiges of this activity had been found such as the use of fire with high temperatures, nugget and slags for casting metals, ores and other indications.

Goldsmithery contributed for Póvoa de Varzim being a reference for proto-historical archaeology in North-western Iberian Peninsula. Namely, with the finding of some complete jewellery: the Earrings of Laundos and the articulated necklace and earrings of Estela. In the proper Cividade, some certifications of works in gold and silver had been collected by Rocha Peixoto. In all the mountain range of Rates, the ancient mining explorations are visible: Castro and Roman ones, given that these hills possessed the essential gold and silver used for jewellery production.

In 1904, a mason while building a mill in the top of São Félix Hill, in the vicinity of the smaller Castro de Laundos, found a vase with jewellery inside, these pieces had been bought by Rocha Peixoto that took them to the Museum of Porto. The jewellery was made using an evolved technique, very similar to ones made in the Mediterranean, namely with the use of plates and welds, filigree and granulated.

=== Religion and death rituals ===
Religious cults and ceremonies had the objective to harmonize the people with natural forces. The Castro people had a great number of deities, but in the coastal area where the city is located, Cosus, a native deity related in later periods to the Roman god Mars, prevailed to such an extent that no other deities popular in the hinterland were venerated in the coastal region where Cosus was worshiped.

Some cesspits, for instance organized as a pentagon, adorn the flagstone of the Cividade, their function is unknown, but may have had some magical-religious function.

The funerary ritual of the Cividade was probably common to other pre-Roman peoples of the Portuguese territory, but archaeological data are very rarely found in the Castro area, excepting at Cividade de Terroso.

The ritual of the Cividade was the rite of cremation and placing the ashes of their dead in small circular-shaped cesspits with stonework adornment in the interior of the houses. In later periods, the ashes were deposited in the exterior of the houses, but still inside of the family setting.

In 1980, the discovery of a funerary cist, and an entire vase, and fragments of another one without covering, evidences breaking. This vase was very similar to another found in São Félix Hill, this last one with jewels in its interior, assuming that these jewels had the same funerary context.

== Trade ==
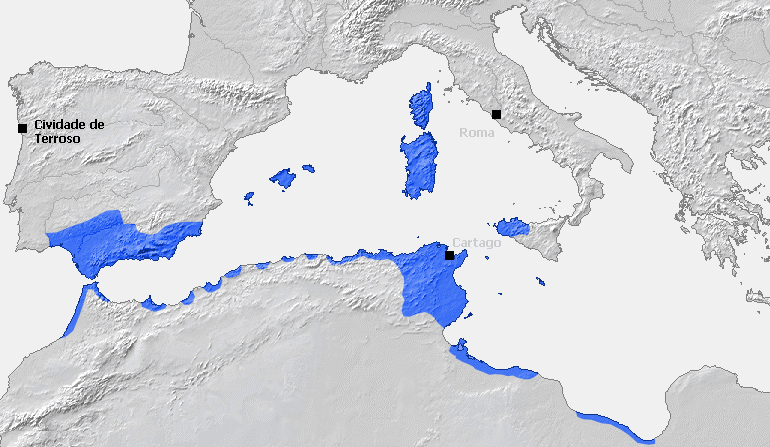
Cividade de Terroso, Rome, Carthage and Carthaginian influence sphere before the First Punic War.

The visits of Phoenicians, Carthaginians, Greeks, and Romans had as objective the exchange of fabrics and wine for gold and tin, despite the scarcity of terrestrial ways, this was not a problem for Cividade de Terroso that was strategically located close to the sea and the Ave River, thus an extensive commerce existed via the Atlantic and river routes as archeological remains prove. However, one land route was known, the Silver Way (as named in the Roman Era) that started in the south of the peninsula reaching the northeast over land.

The external commerce, dominated by tin, was complemented with domestic commerce in tribal markets between the different cities and villages of the Castro culture, they exchanged textiles, metals (gold, copper, tin and lead) and other objects including exotic products, such as glass or exotic ceramics, proceeding from contacts with the peoples of the Mediterranean or other areas of the Peninsula.

With the annexation of the Castro region by the Roman Republic, the commerce starts to be one of the main ways for regional economic development, with the Roman merchants organized in associations known as collegia. These associations functioned as true commercial companies who looked for monopoly in commercial relations.

== Museum facility ==
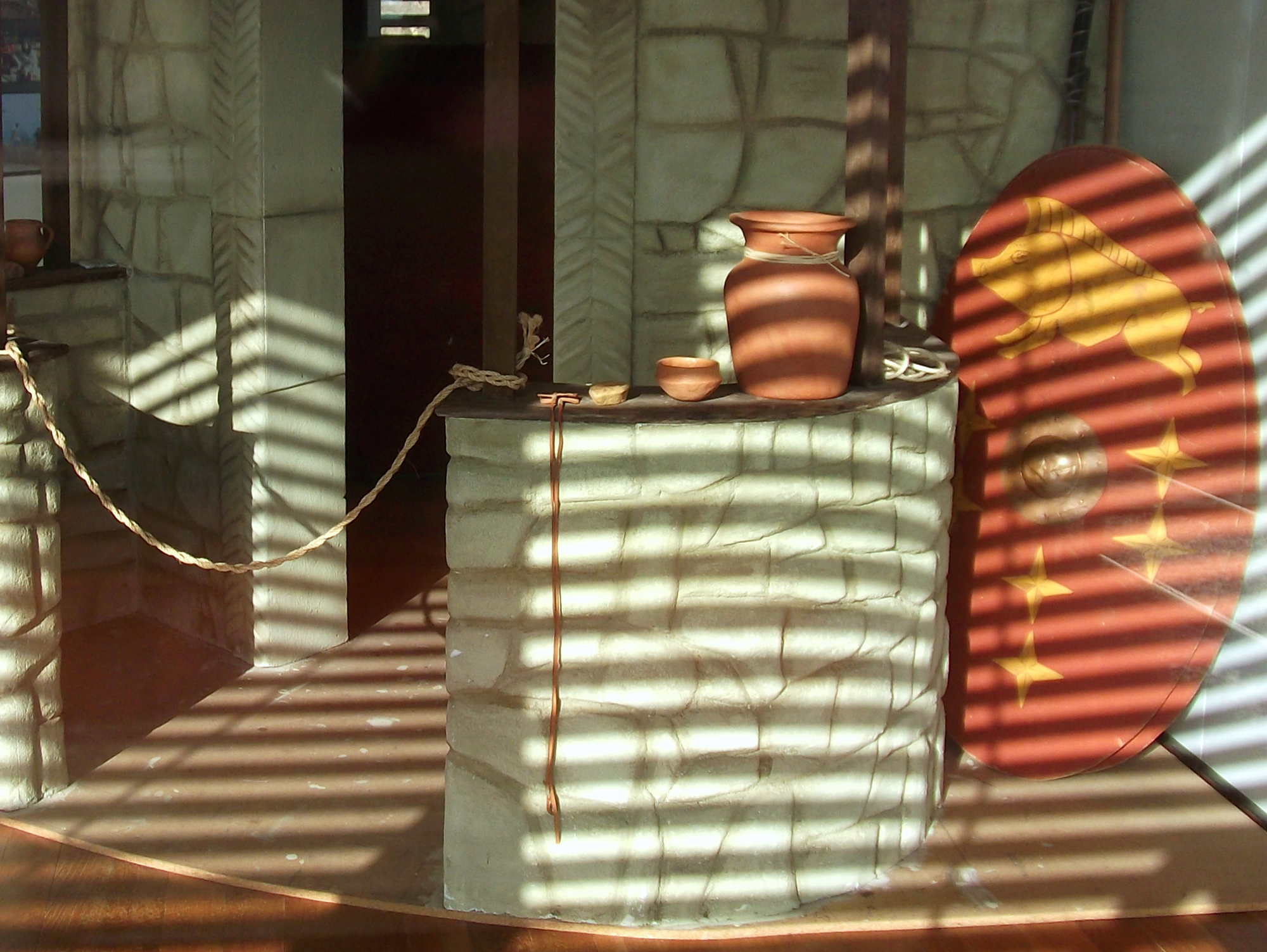
A representation of a house in the museum.

In the entrance of the town there is a small museum with facilities that are intended only to support the visit to the Cividade itself, such as pictures, representations and public toilets. It is a small extension of the Ethnography and History Museum of Póvoa de Varzim, located in Póvoa de Varzim City Center, where the most relevant artifacts are kept. Although the city is protected by fences and a gate near the museum, the entrance to the city is free.
