= São Félix Hill =

Highest hill in Póvoa de Varzim, Portugal

Coordinates: 41.435°N 8.715°W

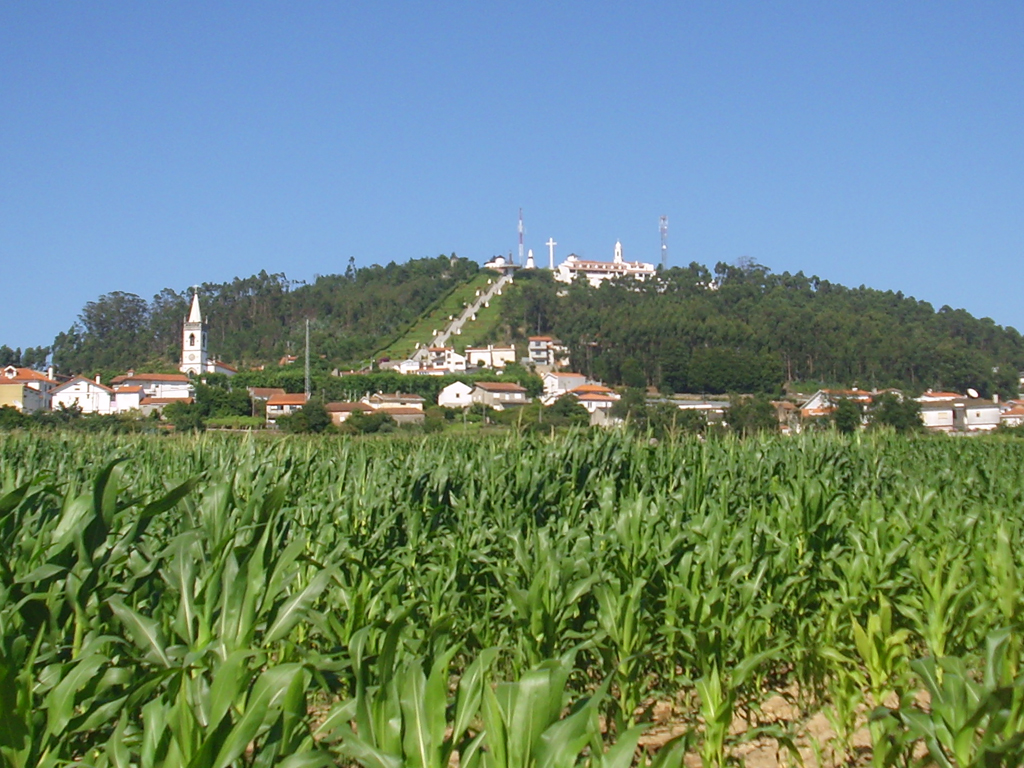
São Félix as seen from the countryside.

São Félix Hill or Mount São Félix, Monte de São Félix in Portuguese, is the highest hill in Póvoa de Varzim, Portugal, as measured by the height above sea level of its summit, 202 metres (663 ft).

São Félix is the north of the two hills east of the city, the other being Cividade Hill. São Félix is located in the civil parish of Laundos, and is a sequence of Serra de Rates mountain range. In the Middle Ages the hill was known as Lanudos, hence the name of the civil parish.

Despite its low height, São Félix is easily distinguished in the landscape because it is a significant rise in front of a coastal plain. Alto River's source is located in São Félix Hill and ends at Rio Alto Beach in Estela.

== Myths and religion ==
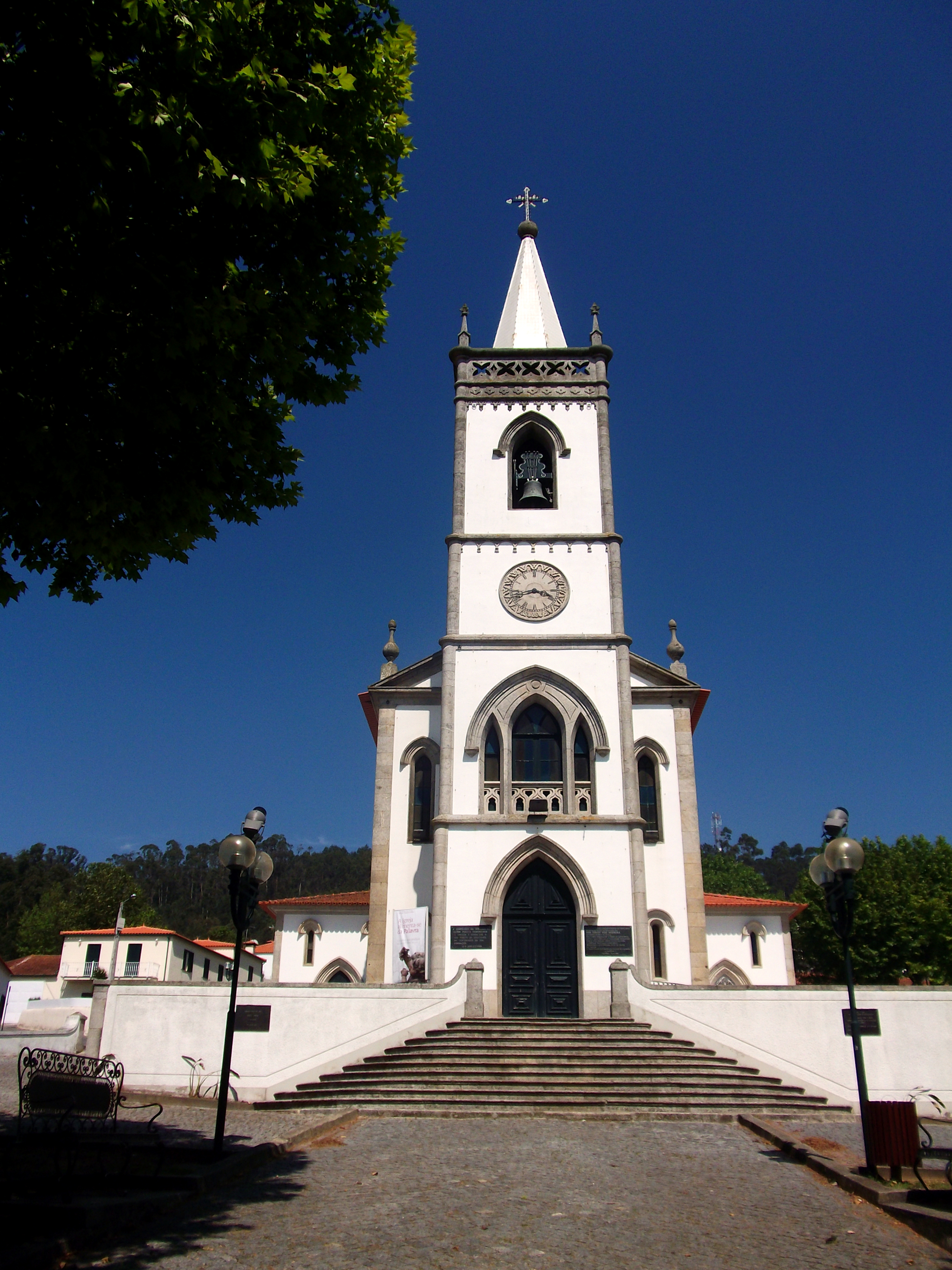
Senhora da Saúde Shrine. Our Lady of Good Health and Saint Félix are venerated in the hill.

The hill is of ancient cult to the people of Póvoa de Varzim, especially the fishermen, as it was used as a reference from the sea. It is one of the sacred hills of Northern Portugal, sacro-monte in Portuguese. It has several temples: Senhora da Saúde chapel, Senhora da Saúde Sanctuary, the small São Félix Chapel, 12 sideway shrines, and the main São Félix Chapel in the top of the hill. While Senhora da Saúde temples are located in the base, the ones from São Félix are located higher in the hill.

It is also the main pilgrimage site of Póvoa de Varzim and Vila do Conde, especially important for the fisher community, who walk a 7 km long way from the Matriz Church of Póvoa de Varzim to Senhora da Saúde Shrine. In the latest pilgrim measures, it gathered 30,000 pilgrims in 2009 and over 40,000 in 2010.

It is believed that Saint Félix used to live in this hill, thus its current name. In a local myth, that became important for Christianity in the Iberian Peninsula, Félix is thought to have found the body of the first bishop of the Iberian Peninsula, Saint Peter of Rates, in the hilltop while seeing a light every evening. This myth was used by Braga clergy in order to justify that city's religious leading role in Christian Iberia.

== Castro culture ruins ==
The hill has ruins of a small castro settlement of around the 2nd century B.C known as Castro de Laundos, that could have been an outpost of Cividade de Terroso. A vase with jewels inside, used in a Castro culture death ritual, was found in 1904 this is one of the most important jewelry artifacts found in Northwest Iberian Peninsula.

== Tourism ==
The hill has iconic panoramic view over the city, its rural area, and beaches; mills (some converted into holiday houses), and the Cividade Hill. The Rates Shooting Camp is located nearby. The São Félix Stairs is used to reach the hilltop and can be a defy to some, although one can also reach the top throw a small road. The stairs throw the hill can be seen from the city as these are illuminated at night.

São Félix Hill

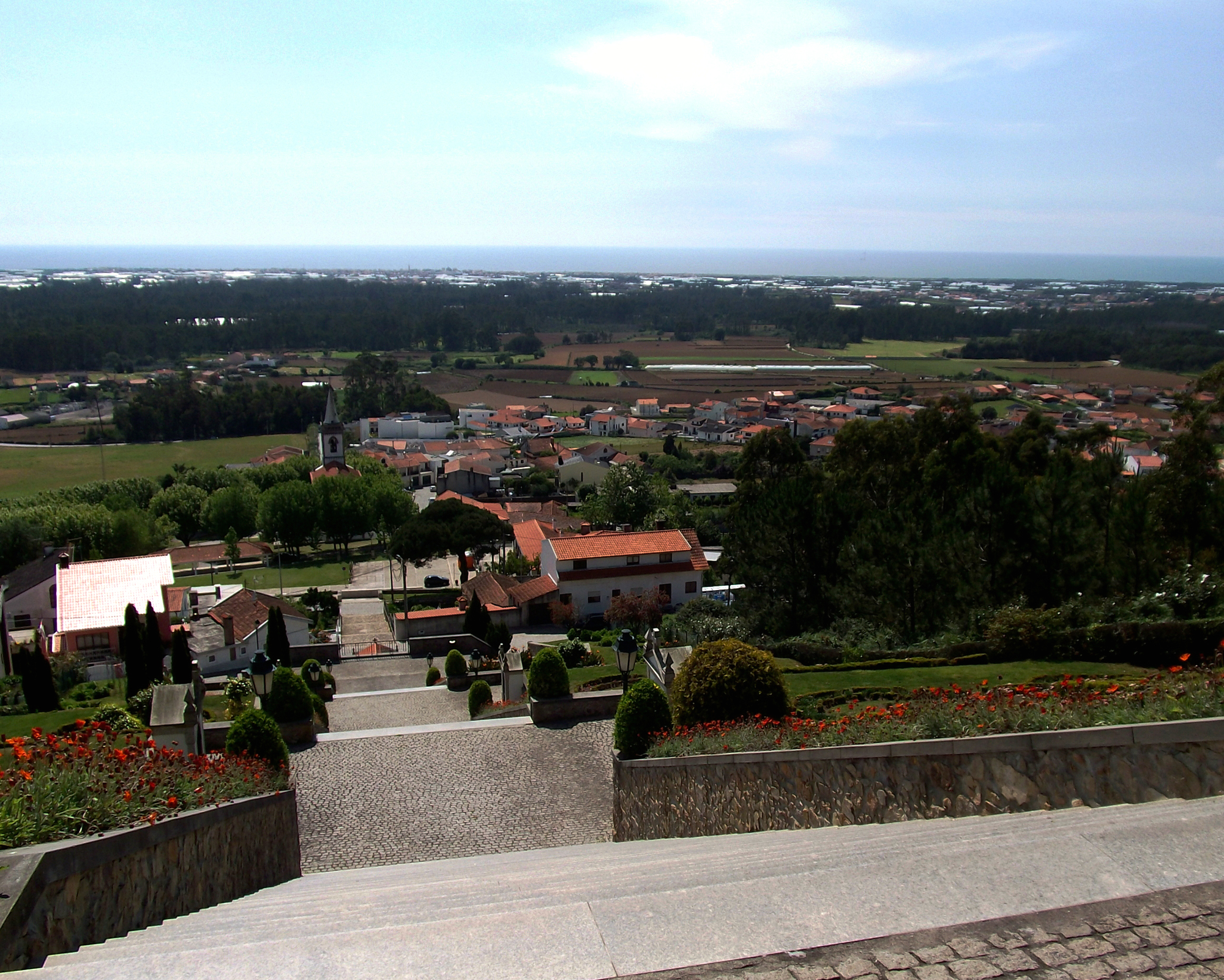
A village in the slope.

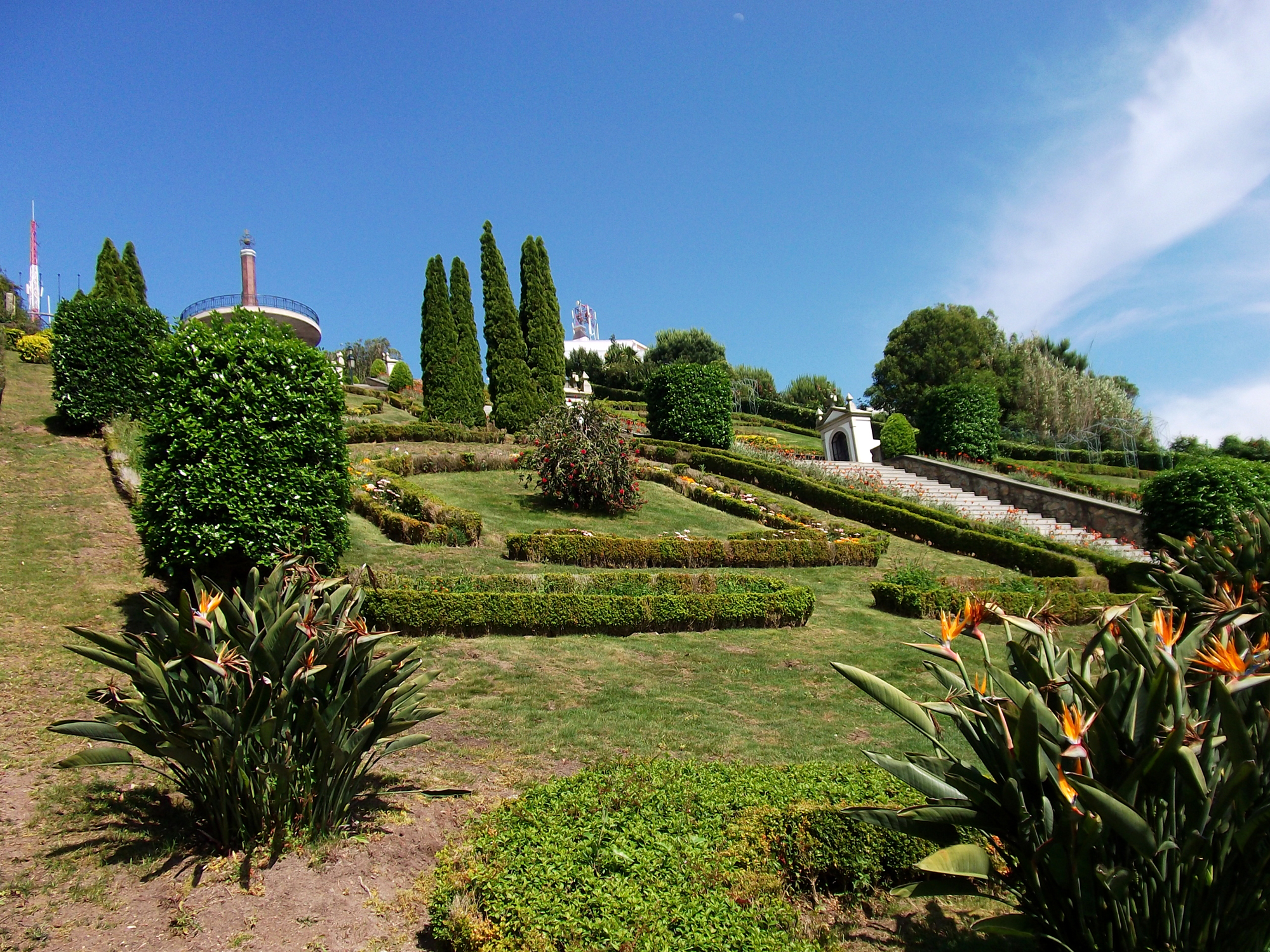
São Félix Hill garden

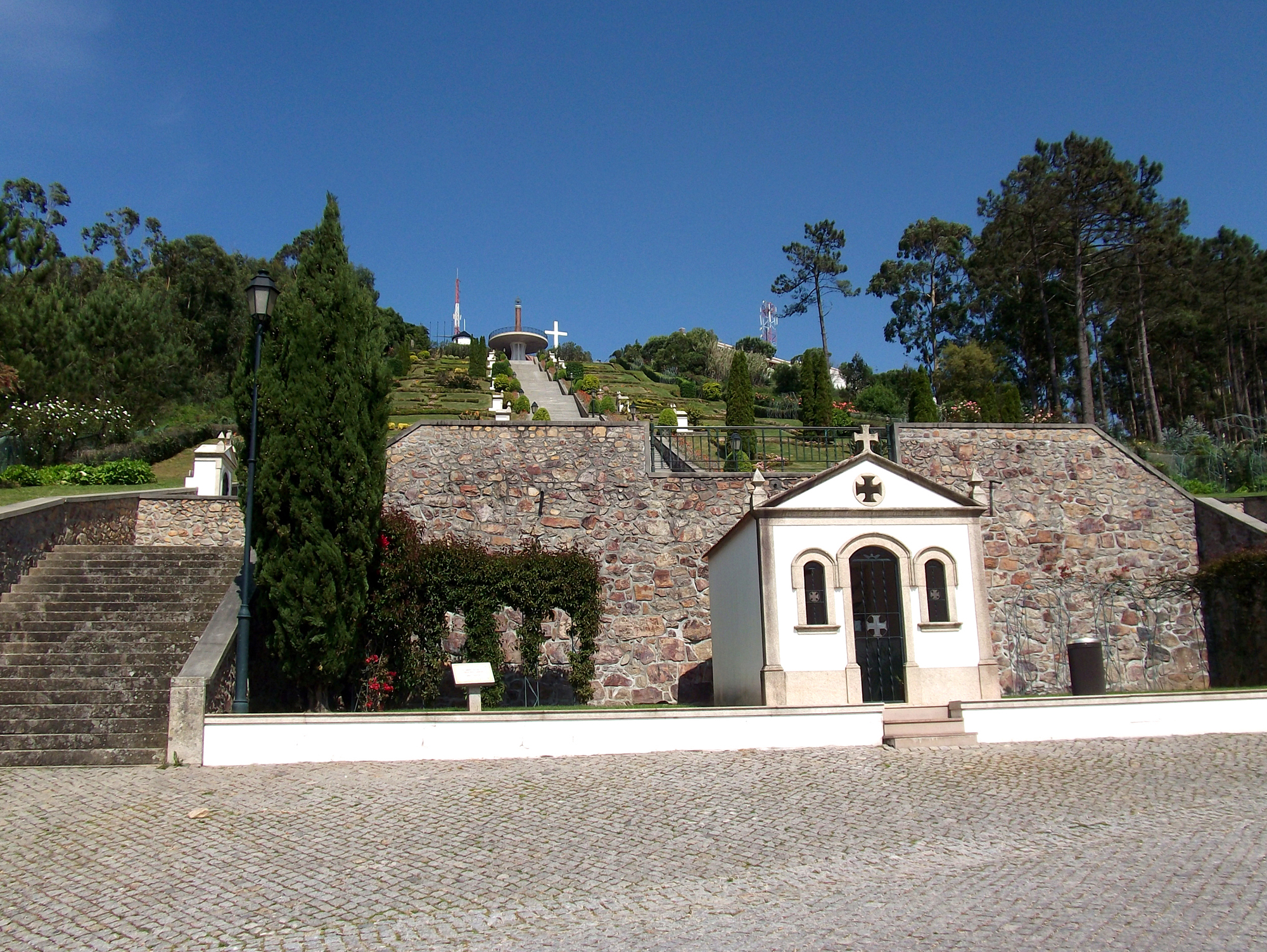
São Félix stairs

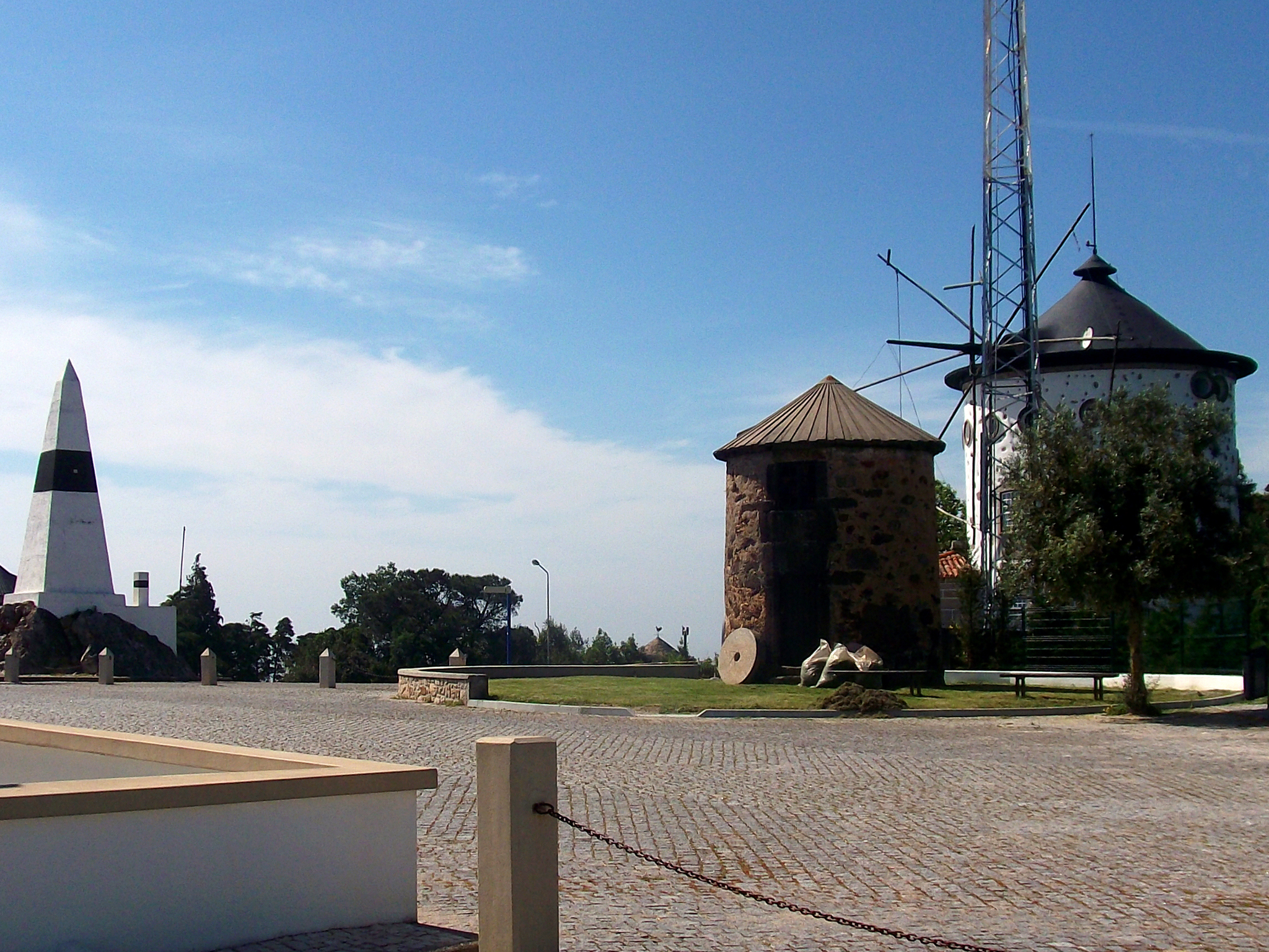
Some of the windmills in the summit of the hill
