= Masseira =

Traditional farming

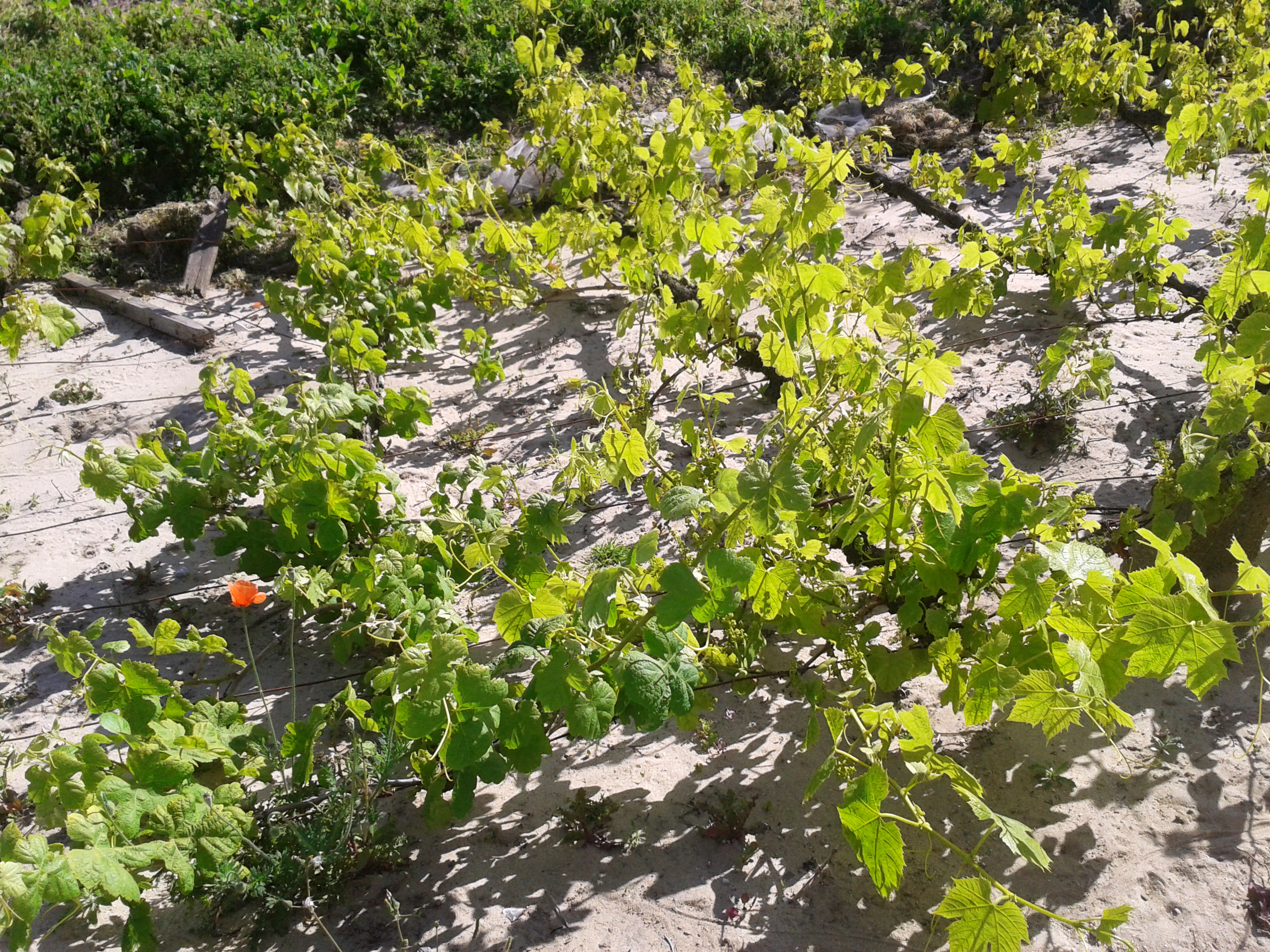
A vineyard in a masseira slope in Rio Alto, Póvoa de Varzim. Farm depression is upwards.

Masseira is a unique form of traditional farming practised in Póvoa de Varzim and Esposende in Portugal.

The masseira technique increases agricultural yields by using large, rectangular depressions dug into the sand dunes of the region, with the sand piled up into banks on the sides of the depression. The term masseira, from the Portuguese for "kneading trough", refers to their characteristic shape. This practice has fallen into disuse.

The masseira technique relies upon a rectangular depression surrounded on four sides by sloping banks, known as the quatro valos ("four walls"). Each individual depression covers an area from 1,000 to 10,000 square metres. Grapes are cultivated on the banks to the south, east and west, and trees and reeds on the northern slope act as a windbreak against the prevailing northern wind. Garden crops, such as cabbage, carrot, lettuce, spinach, onion, tomato, potato, and radish, are grown in the central depression. The sandy soil of the banks stores the sun's heat, enhancing the growth of the grape vines. The banks protect the central area from the wind, and the depression is also cooler and damper than the surrounding land. A change in temperature is created by banks only a few metres high. Allied with the four vine-covered slopes, the masseiras function as a sort of greenhouse. Large amounts of fresh water are required to irrigate the crops, together with sargassum seaweed (gathered from the nearby Atlantic Ocean during the summer) for fertilization.

This type of agriculture was invented in the 18th century by the monks from the Monastery of Tibães, and was once widely used along the coasts of Póvoa de Varzim and Esposende. Currently this type of agriculture is endangered due to the increase in popularity of conventional greenhouses, the chaotic urbanization of the coast, and beach sand being extracted for civil construction. The City Hall of Póvoa de Varzim granted 4,948,377 m^{2} (1,222.771 acres) of its territory for the exclusive use of masseiras as a way to protect this type of traditional agriculture.
