= Cividade Hill =

Hill in northern Portugal

Coordinates: 41.4126°N 8.7209°W

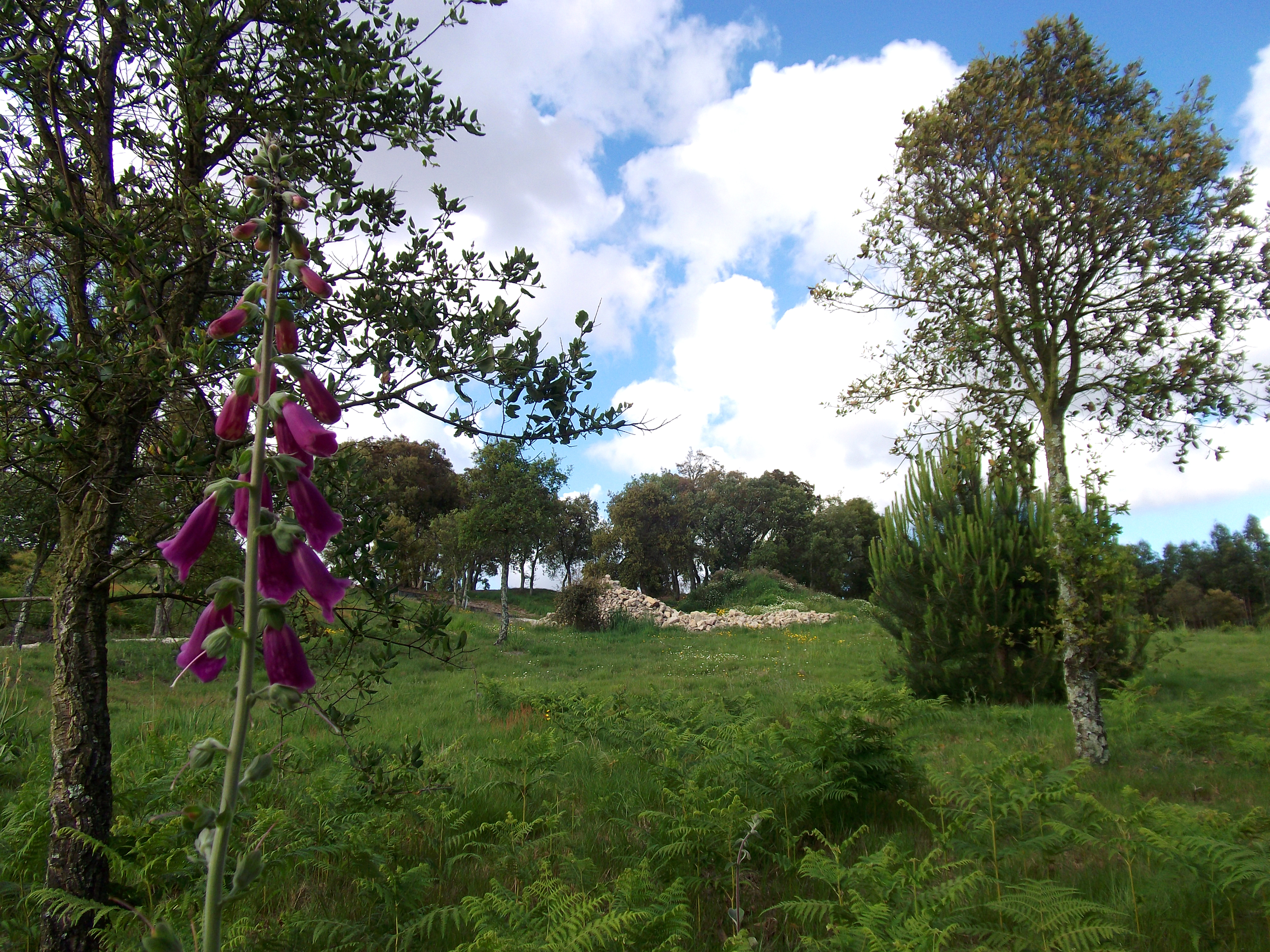
Native flora near the hilltop.

Cividade Hill (Portuguese: Monte da Cividade) or Cividade de Terroso Hill with an elevation of 153 metres (502 ft) is one of the two hills next to the city of Póvoa de Varzim in Portugal.

Cividade Hill's most notable feature is Cividade de Terroso in the hilltop. It is an ancient Castro culture town, hence the name of the hill that derives from Latin civitas (city). The walled city thrived since 900 or 800 BC, before being conquered and destroyed by the Roman Republic around 138 BC. Due to its urban protohistoric characteristics, the hilltop is considered to be an acropolis by archaeologists. The acropolis is, currently, owned by Póvoa de Varzim City Hall. In the slope there are villages and walled labyrinth-like farm-fields.

== Geography ==
Cividade hill is located in the parish of Terroso, just east of the city. The hill, along with São Félix, was used in the Middle Ages as the boundary of Varzim: Verazim ... subtus mons civitas Terroso discurrentes aquas ad mare, territorio Brachara (June 25, 1202). The expression "subtus mons" is typical on the Portuguese medieval documents and, as it was proved by Ferreira de Almeida, it is not just a topographic dependency, but, especially, an administrative and military dependency.

Cividade, with São Félix Hill, extends from the small Serra de Rates mountain range. It is the second highest hill in Póvoa de Varzim, after São Félix Hill.

== Protohistoric city ==
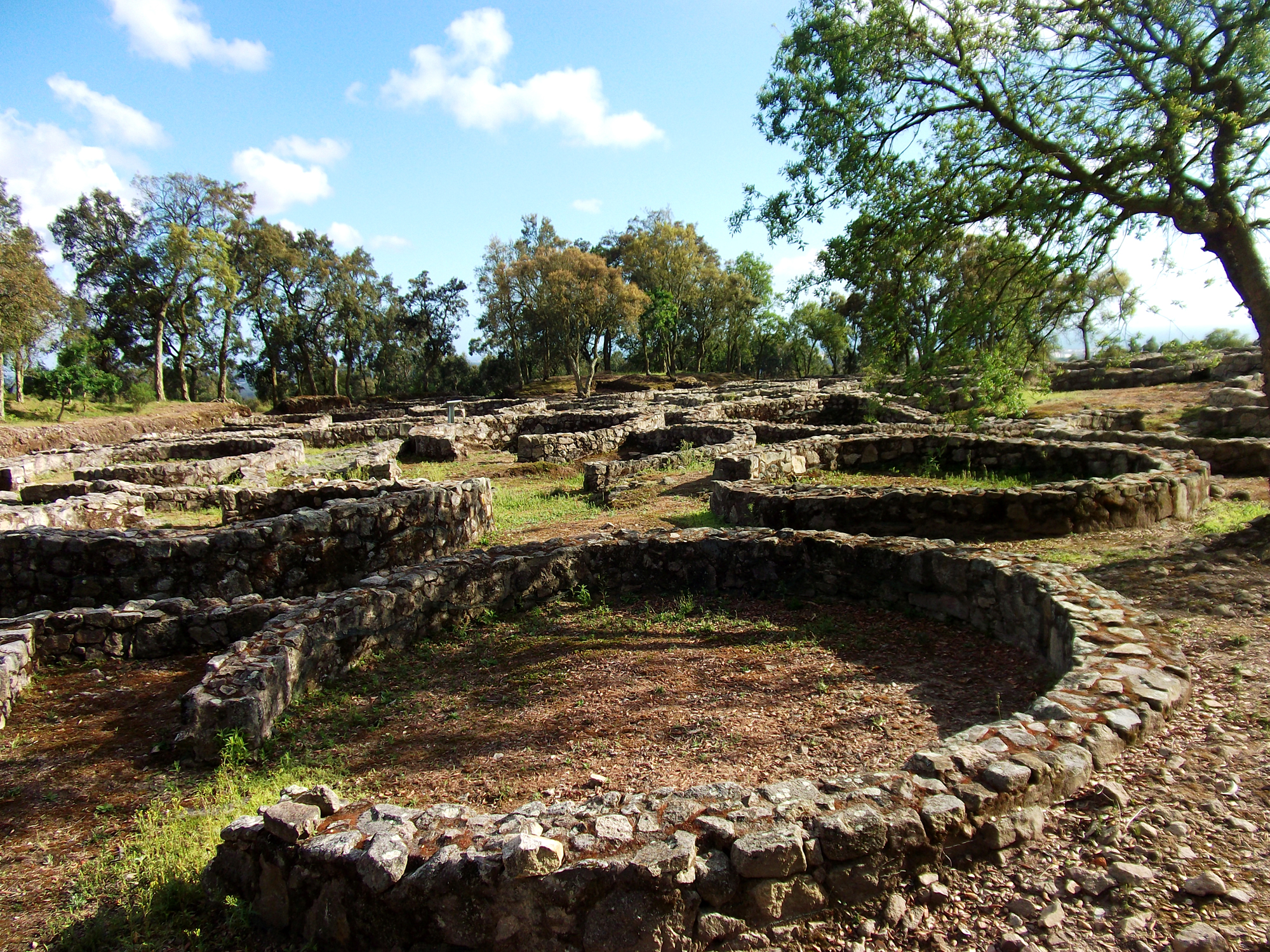
City ruins.

Cividade de Terroso was an important city of the Castro culture in North-western Iberian Peninsula, established during the Bronze Age, between 800 and 900 BC, as a result of the displacement of the people inhabiting the fertile plain of Póvoa de Varzim.

The most typical characteristic is its defensive system. The inhabitants had chosen to start living in the hill as a way of protection against attacks and looting by rival tribes. The migrations of Turduli and Celtici proceeding from the South of the Iberian Peninsula heading North were the reason for the improvement of the defensive systems of the castros around 500 BC. Cividade de Terroso is one of the most heavily defensive castros, given that the acropolis was surrounded by three rings of walls. The defensive perimeter seems to include a ditch of about 1 metre (3 feet 3 inches) of depth and width in base of the hill and a surveillance post in São Félix Hill.

== Prehistoric necropolis ==
A necropolis, with seven tumuli, dating to end of the Neolithic, early Chalcolithic is known around the hill. The necropolis was built during the beginning of the permanent habitation of the region, 4 to 6 thousand years ago, and thus much older than Cividade itself.

In Portugal, these barrows are called mamoa, from the Latin mammula, given to them by the Romans because of their shape, similar to the breast of a woman (mama in Portuguese). Near Cividade de Terroso there's the most relevant one, the Mamoa de Sejães. This tumuli is located near the hamlet of Sejães, in the eastern hill slope. Given the fact that no archaeological surveys were made until the present day, nothing is known about the structure of the monument, and after thousands of years it is still unbroken.

Other nearby tumuli around Cividade and São Félix hills, including Mamoa de Abade, just off Sejães, the Mamoa de Monte Redondo, Mamoa da Cova da Andorinha and Mamoa da Estrada, all broken. There are references to other tumuli and dolmens, including Mão Pedrosa, Leira da Anta and another one in Balasar.

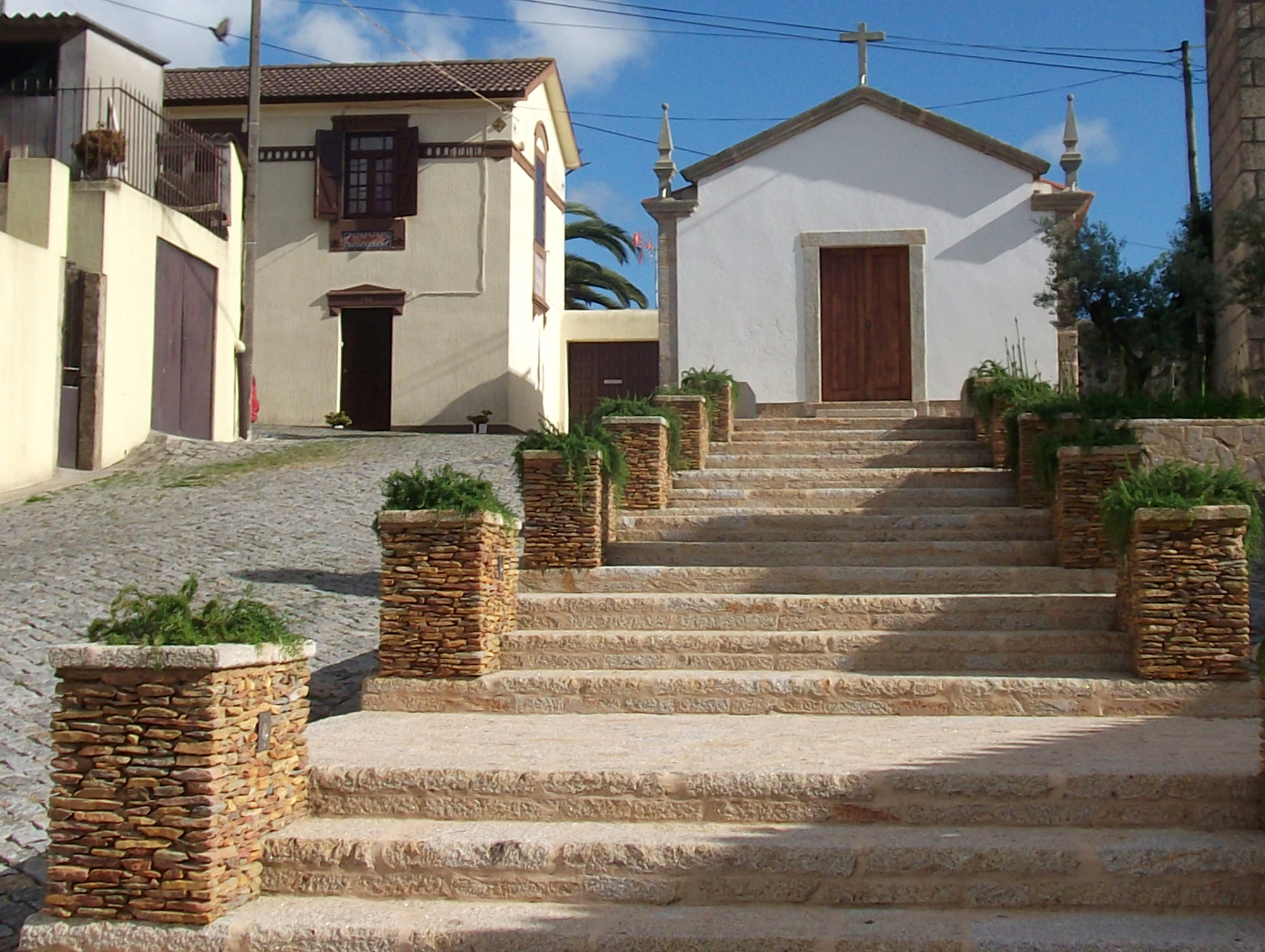
Divino Salvador Chapel was built in 1670 as an abbot's mausoleum.

== Villages ==
In the hill slope there are villages, namely Terroso, the seat of the civil parish. Terroso is a picturesque historical village with its parish church built in 1718, that includes in its assets the 16th century icon of Our Lady of Candeias, a Coimbra School sculpture. The icon is said to have washed up on the shore of Azurara and the people of several villages tried to get it, but were the ones from Terroso who grabbed it and it was seen as a sign. The Sancta Maria de Terroso parish is known since the 11th century.

In Praça do Cruzeiro, the main entrance to Cividade de Terroso, there's the Divino Salvador Chapel built in 1670 by the Abbot Teotónio de Miranda as his mausoleum. It has an interesting painted altarpiece that features the Miracle of Ourique.

== Ancient flora ==
The vegetation that is currently found in the hilltop is the result of intense human activity for over 2000 years, and the human farming and forestry practices. In the modern period, eucalypts have been planted in pulpwood plantations, which Póvoa de Varzim City Hall has been trying to eradicate and attempting to replace it with native flora that research proved to have existed in the area. Carbon analysis found in archaeological layers of Cividade de Terroso allowed the identification of twenty native species of trees and shrubs.

- Alnus glutinosa (Black Alder)
- Arbutus unedo (Strawberry Tree)
- Corylus avellana (Hazel)
- Erica arborea
- Erica sp.
- Ericaceae indet.
- Frangula alnus
- Fraxinus angustifolia
- Leguminosae indet. (peas)
- Leguminosae Ulex type
- Monocotyledon
- Pinus pinaster (Maritime Pine)
- Quercus sp. (Oak)
- Quercus suber (Cork Oak)
- Quercus ilex (holm oak)
- Quercus / Castanea (Chestnut)
- Crataegus monogyna
- Pyrus communis (European Pear)
- Rosaceae
- Salix sp. (Willow)
- Sambucus nigra (Elderberry)
- Ulmus sp.

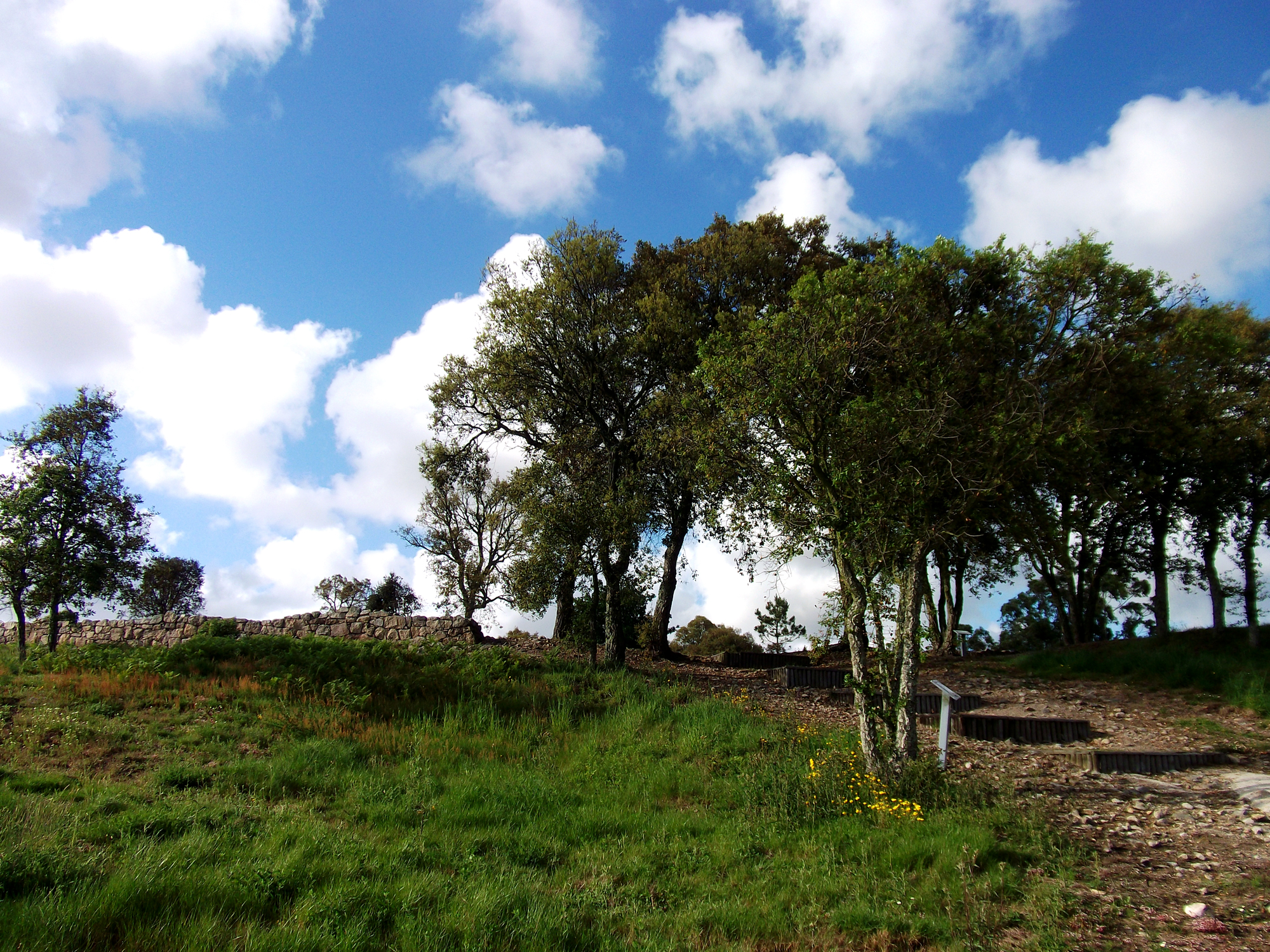
The hilltop. Cividade de Terroso Doorway.
