= Alto River =

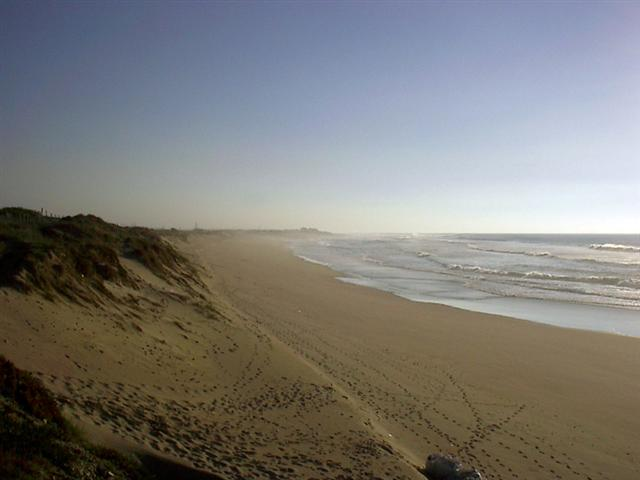
- The Alto River is a tourist area for golfers, naturists, campers, and agronomists.

- Location of the mouth of the river in Portugal

Location
- Country: Portugal
- Region: Norte
- District: Porto
- Municipality: Póvoa de Varzim

Physical characteristics
- Source: São Félix Hill
  - location: Laundos Parish
- Mouth: Atlantic Ocean
  - location: Rio Alto Beach, Estela Parish
  - coordinates: 41°28′N 8°47′W
  - elevation: 0 m (0 ft)

The Alto River (Portuguese: Rio Alto, lit. 'High River'; Portuguese pronunciation: [ˈaltu])) is a small river in the municipality of Póvoa de Varzim, Porto District, Portugal. The river's source is at the foot of São Félix Hill in Laundos Parish, and it empties into the Atlantic Ocean at Rio Alto Beach in Estela Parish. The shoreline of Estela is also known as the Rio Alto.

The Alto's minute estuary area is known for its wide sand dunes and has become a tourist destination. One of the local facilities is the Camping Park of Rio Alto, which is surrounded by a forest of pine trees planted by the Monks of Tibães in the 18th century and the peculiar masseiras farm fields, which were also made by these monks.

Nearby are the Estela Golf Club, and the naturist beach area of Alto River. To the north are the ruins of the Roman villa known as Villa Mendo, which was abandoned in the beginning of the early years of Portugal.

In 1908, two local individuals, knowing that ancient artifacts were sometimes found in the area, decided to investigate the place and discovered jewels, gold and silver. They took the jewels to a silversmith who verified the value and antiquity of the artifacts and spoke to António Rocha Peixoto, an archaeologist who was in Póvoa de Varzim. Peixoto and José Fortes asked the finders about the location of the findings. Some time later, Fortes published an article in the Portugália stating that these jewels were of the Castro culture. Several people tried to find the town that was probably below the sand dunes, but without success, and only a few minor findings were made. In June 1992, while removing sands, a bulldozer driver found a wall and ceramics, remains of the lost Roman villa.
