= Localities of Póvoa de Varzim =

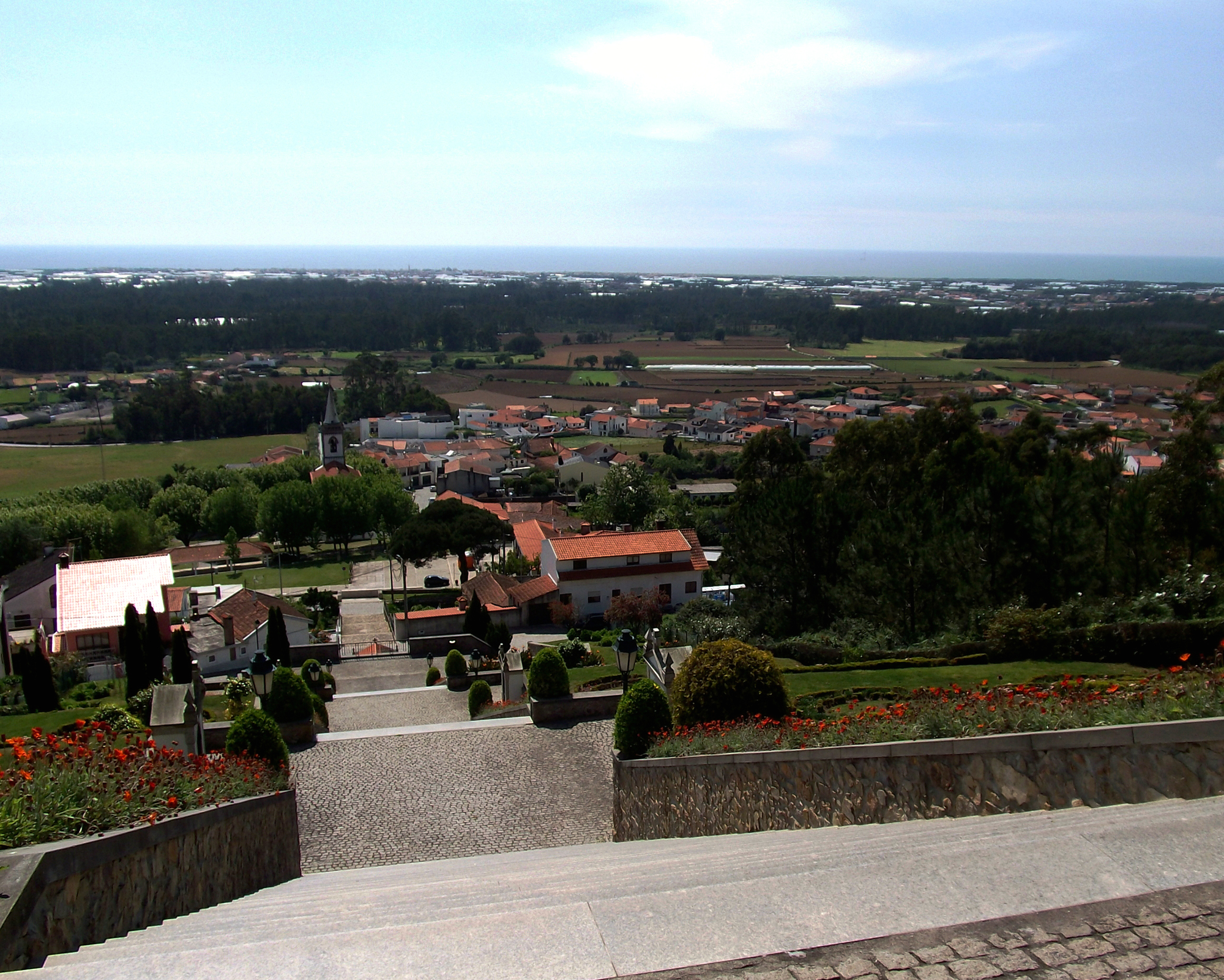
Senhora da Saúde at the foot of São Félix Hill.

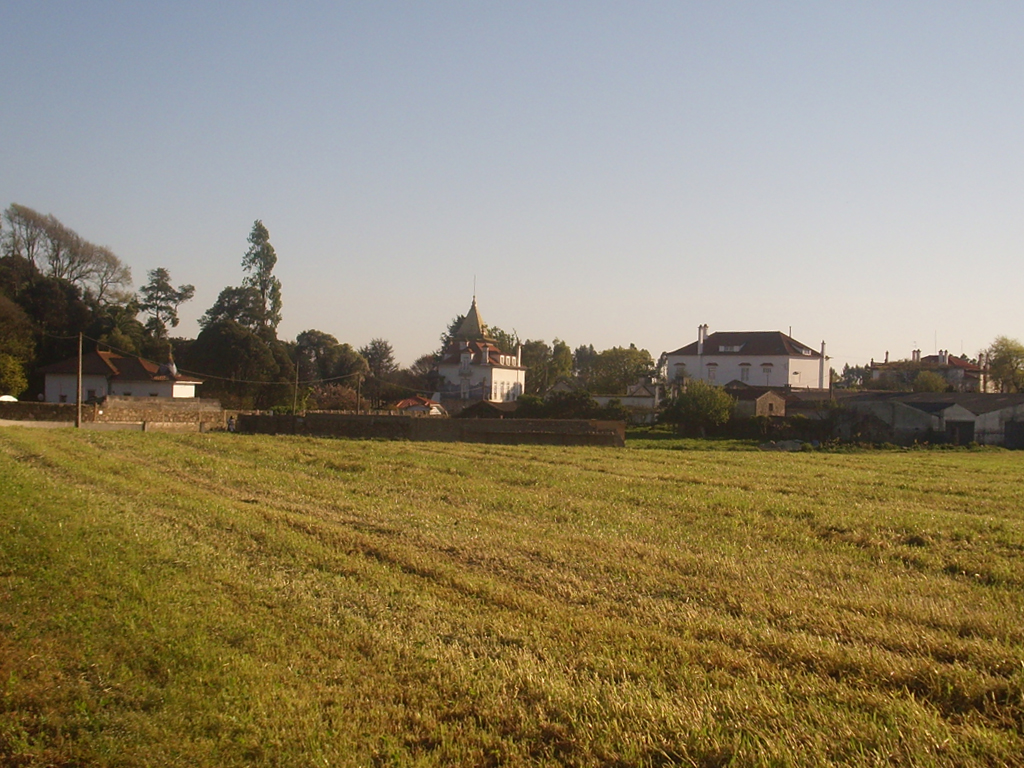
Calves in the outskirts of Póvoa de Varzim.

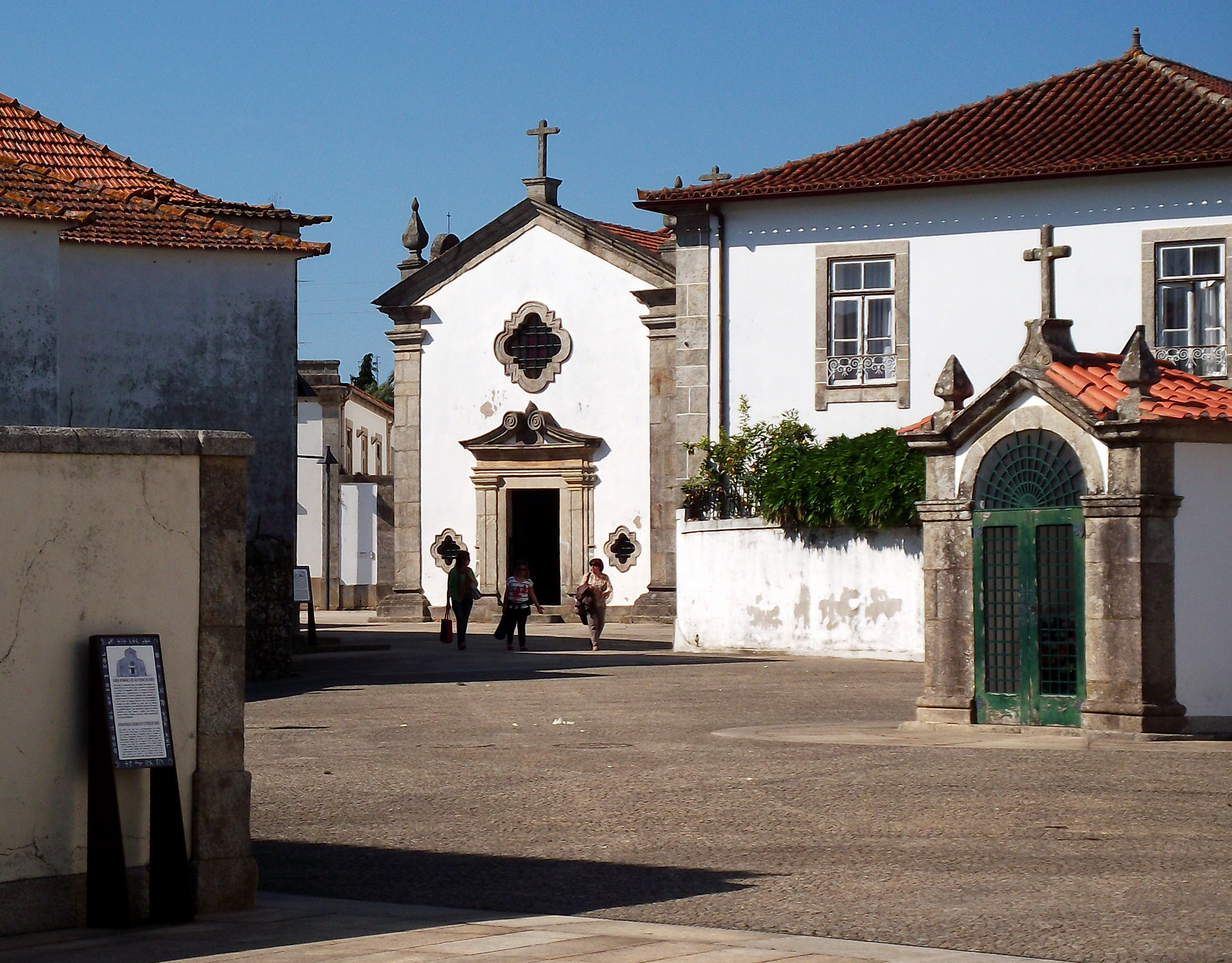
São Pedro de Rates, a former township.

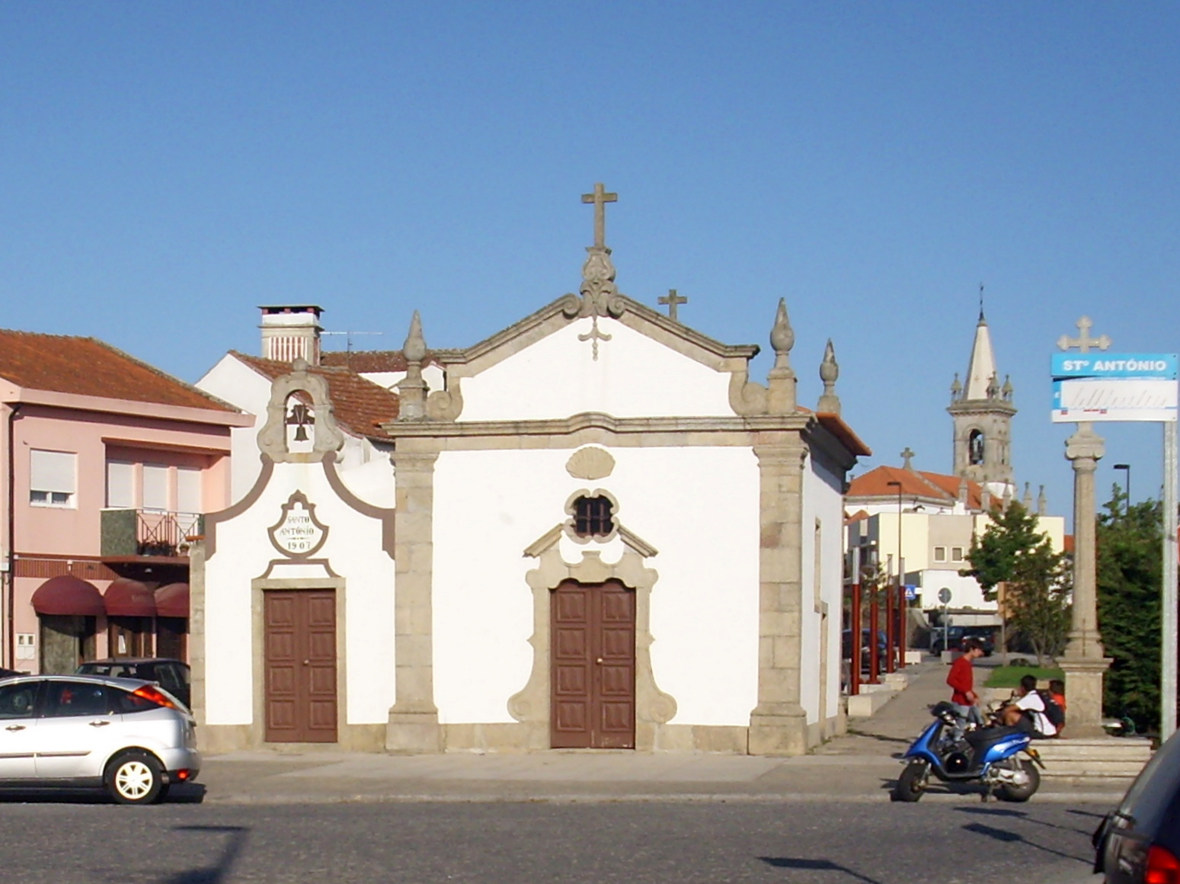
Cadilhe in the city's outskirts.

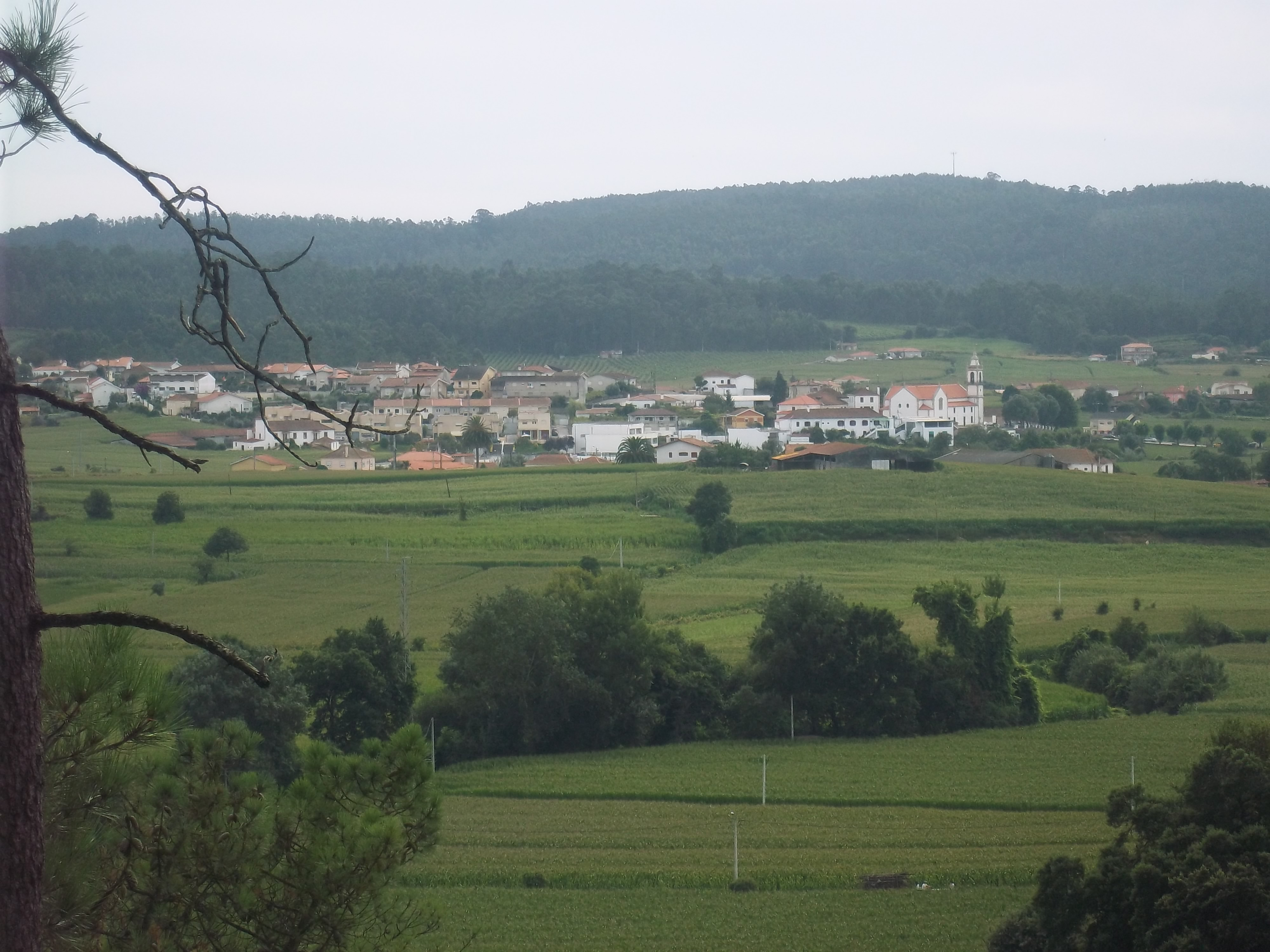
The civil parish of Balazar.

Around the city of Póvoa de Varzim in Portugal there are many dependent settlements or hamlets dispersed in the civil parishes. These parishes have dispersed settlement, with small clusters that are called Lugares (literally, Places) or Localidades (localities) in Portugal, these hamlets are also known as villages (aldeias) and most of the municipal territory and beyond is actually continuous, in urban terms, with the city in the highways that link it to neighbouring cities such as Barcelos, Famalicão or Esposende, the same occurs to the South, and several of these hamlets are suburbs with a number of separate farmsteads scattered throughout the area.

== History ==
Póvoa de Varzim suburbs were differentiated into two: Arrabaldes (outskirts) and aldeias (villages). The Arrabaldes were located just off the town core and by the main streets, and were part of the urban area, including places such as the Old Town of Póvoa de Varzim (Vila Velha), Regufe, or Giesteira. The aldeias were located farther apart. In 1758, the lieutenant of Póvoa fortress, Veiga Leal, tell them apart using small gunshots: if closer, it was an Arrabalde, if away an Aldeia. Although the inhabitants of more distant suburbs would not go to the town center to work, they depended on it as their service center and marketplace, to buy and sell their goods. The town also depended on its periphery for workers, food, water and raw materials.

Already in the 16th century and especially in the 17th some new suburbs started to appear. In 1736, four outskirts were named: Vila Velha, Giesteira, Casal do Monte, and Regufe. In 1758, the number increased to 7, with Gandra, Coelheiro, and Moninhas. In 1763, there were 10 and in 1832, 12. Although this list may be inaccurate, as several other outskirts were known to exist at the time.

== List ==
As of 2011 Census, Póvoa de Varzim includes 99 localities, including the city and many hamlets, several of which are city outskirts, part of the suburban sprawl, small villages also remain.

Locality	Population (2011 census)	Parish(es)
Póvoa de Varzim	40,053	A Ver-o-Mar, Amorim, Argivai, Beiriz, P.Varzim
(scattered population)	22	A Ver-o-Mar
Aldeia	690	Aguçadoura
Areosa	619	Aguçadoura
Caturela	393	Aguçadoura
Codixeira	1,487	Aguçadoura
Granjeiro	260	Aguçadoura
Santo André de Baixo	520	Aguçadoura
Santo André de Cima	266	Aguçadoura
(scattered population)	22	Aguçadoura
Agra	296	Amorim
Aldeia Nova	77	Amorim
Amorim de Cima	326	Amorim
Cadilhe	429	Amorim
Mandim	235	Amorim
Mourilhe	64	Amorim
Pedroso	153	Amorim
Sistelos	73	Amorim
Torrinha	147	Amorim
Travassos	392	Amorim
Aldeia	76	Amorim
Fontainhas	30	Amorim
Cardosas	289	Amorim
Esqueirinhas	29	Amorim
Calves	119	Argivai, Beiriz
Além	119	Balazar
Calvário	115	Balazar
Caminho Largo	97	Balazar
Casal	347	Balazar
Cruz	150	Balazar
Fontainhas	641	Balazar
Gandra	219	Balazar
Gestrins	296	Balazar
Lousadelo	44	Balazar
Quinta	49	Balazar
Vela	139	Balazar
Vila Pouca	121	Balazar
Covilhã	28	Balazar
Telo	102	Balazar
Outeiro	66	Balazar
(scattered population)	10	Balazar
Beiriz de Baixo	126	Beiriz
Cutéres	103	Beiriz
Fraião	191	Beiriz
Mau Verde	45	Beiriz
Outeiro	126	Beiriz
Paredes	243	Beiriz
Pedreira	652	Beiriz
Penela	433	Beiriz
Quintã	369	Beiriz
Xisto	129	Beiriz
Igreja	111	Beiriz
Silvas	325	Beiriz
Fonte Nova	62	Beiriz
Barros	180	Estela
Carrascos	33	Estela
Carregosa	168	Estela
Contriz	144	Estela
Estrada	65	Estela
Igreja	100	Estela
Outeiro	113	Estela
Pedrinha	235	Estela
Têso	569	Estela
Urzes	277	Estela
Frinjo	126	Estela
Baldoia	23	Estela
(scattered population)	18	Estela
Águas Férreas	123	Laundos
Igreja	47	Laundos
Laúndos	264	Laundos
Machuqueiras	266	Laundos
Outeiro	162	Laundos
Pé do Monte	323	Laundos
Rapijães	280	Laundos
Real	93	Laundos
Recreio	208	Laundos
Senhora da Saúde	244	Laundos
(scattered population)	45	Laundos
Agra de Bouças	86	Navais
Burgada	141	Navais
Cabreira	61	Navais
Crasto	15	Navais
Espadelos	192	Navais
Espinhal	207	Navais
Navais	47	Navais
Outeiro	276	Navais
Prelades	268	Navais
Sonhim	186	Navais
São Pedro de Rates	2,465	Rates
(scattered population)	40	Rates
Boavista	154	Terroso
Carregal	64	Terroso
Ordem	97	Terroso
Paranho	73	Terroso
Pé do Monte	309	Terroso
Póvoas	194	Terroso
Santo António	250	Terroso
São Lourenço	101	Terroso
São Salvador	131	Terroso
Sejães	349	Terroso
Vilar	163	Terroso
Passô	425	Terroso
Chamosinhos	109	Terroso
Pincelos	100	Terroso
(scattered population)	9	Terroso
