= Civil Parishes of Póvoa de Varzim =

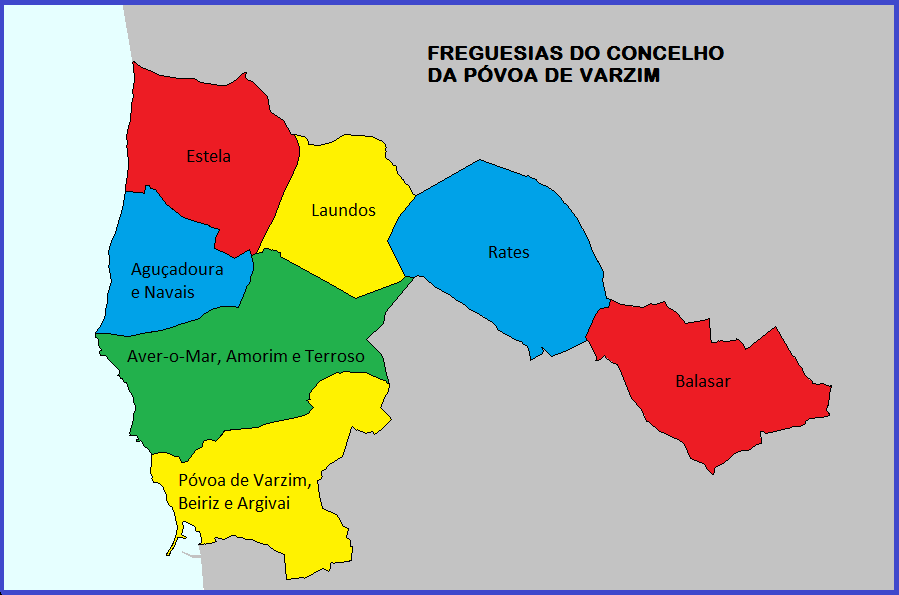
Map with the seven civil parishes of Póvoa de Varzim

Póvoa de Varzim is divided into seven civil parishes, most of which were created as civil entities in the 19th century and some were merged in the 21st century, but are directly derived from ecclesiastical parishes existing since the Early Middle Ages. These parishes are grouped into three areas recognized by the Municipal masterplan: urban (city), suburban and rural.

== History ==
In the Middle Ages, most of the municipality was part of the Lordship of Varzim, a military and administrative entity established by Guterre Pelayo, a companion of Henry, count of Portugal. When the municipality was established, in 1308, the municipality was made up of the urban area of the town alone which, over time, approached the medieval borders. In the 18th century, the Aver-o-Mar area (of the parish of Amorim) was annexed, by royal order, to Póvoa de Varzim, as it had to an increasing population made up of fishing-farmers.

With the 1836 administrative reform, Póvoa started to definitively control the surrounding land: the Rates township was annexed, the lands of Argivai, Balasar, Estela, Laundos, Navais, Terroso, Outeiro Maior, Parada, Rio Mau, and Santagões were acquired or recovered. In 1853, it exchanged the last four with neighbouring Vila do Conde and got Amorim and Beiriz.

With the civil reforms in 2011–2012, several parishes merged in the urban and suburban areas, while the rural ones, away from the city center, were preserved. According to the Technical Unit project, the five civil parishes in which the urban area (the city) is located merged into two civil parishes and reduced the twelve into seven civil parishes by creating the "Union of the Parishes of Póvoa de Varzim, Argivai and Beiriz", the "Union of the Parishes of Aver-o-Mar, Amorim and Terroso", and the "Union of the Parishes of Aguçadoura and Navais".

== Civil parishes ==
- A Ver-o-Mar (locality: Póvoa de Varzim)
  Map with the 12 former civil parishes of Póvoa de Varzim
- Aguçadoura
- Amorim (locality: Póvoa de Varzim)
- Argivai (locality: Póvoa de Varzim)
- Balazar
- Beiriz (locality: Póvoa de Varzim)
- Estela
- Laundos
- Póvoa de Varzim (locality: Póvoa de Varzim)
- Navais
- Rates (locality: São Pedro de Rates)
- Terroso

Under the 2012 reforms, the municipality was reduced to 7 civil parishes:

- Balazar
- Estela
- Laundos
- Aguçadoura e Navais
- Aver-o-Mar, Amorim e Terroso (locality: Póvoa de Varzim)
- Póvoa de Varzim, Beiriz e Argivai (locality: Póvoa de Varzim)
- Rates (locality: São Pedro de Rates)

== localities ==
Parishes do not correspond to actual villages as all of the parishes, excepting for the city, have dispersed settlement, with small clusters that are called Lugares or Localidades, in Póvoa these are often known as villages (aldeias) and most of the municipal territory and beyond is actually continuous, in urban terms, with the city in the highways that link it to neighbouring cities such as Barcelos, Famalicão or Esposende, the same occurs in the South, and several of these hamlets function as suburbs. There are a number of separate farmsteads scattered throughout the area.

As of 2011 Census, Póvoa de Varzim includes 99 localities, including the city and a large number of hamlets, some of which in recent periods became neighborhoods or, in some cases, merged with neighboring villages.
