= List of churches in Póvoa de Varzim =

Roman Catholic churches(igreja) or chapels (capela) is a common feature of the landscape in the municipality of Póvoa de Varzim in Portugal. The list also include a sanctuary (santuário) and a basilica (basílica), but does not include sideway shrines, such as the city's alminhas and other similar religious constructions.

Póvoa de Varzim is divided into 14 parishes and is part of the Archdeacon of Vila do Conde and Póvoa de Varzim, located in the Archdiocese of Braga.

== List of Parish churches and other churches and chapels ==
The list only includes religious temples from the Roman Catholic Church, it does not include temples from other faiths.

Parish	Parish dedicated to (Portuguese title)	church name in Portuguese	first built
Aguçadoura	Nossa Senhora da Boa Viagem	Igreja Paroquial de Nossa Senhora da Boa Viagem da Aguçadoura	1952–1962
Aguçadoura	Nossa Senhora da Boa Viagem	Façade of the Antiga Igreja de Nossa Senhora da Boa Viagem da Aguçadoura	1874, reformed 1908
Aguçadoura	Nossa Senhora da Boa Viagem	Capela de Nossa Senhora de Fátima da Aguçadoura	
Amorim	Santiago	Igreja Paroquial de Santiago de Amorim	1904–1920
Amorim	Santiago	Igreja Velha de Santiago de Amorim	Romanesque foundation. Reconstruction in 1595
Amorim	Santiago	Capela de Santo António de Cadilhe	1651. reformed 1907.
Argivai	São Miguel	Igreja Paroquial de São Miguel-o-Anjo de Argivai	Time immemorial. Reformed 1866.
Argivai	São Miguel	Capela de Nossa Senhora do Bom Sucesso de Argivai	1767.
Aver-o-Mar	Nossa Senhora das Neves	Igreja Paroquial de Nossa Senhora das Neves de A Ver-o-Mar	Time immemorial. Reformed 1881–1883
Aver-o-Mar	Nossa Senhora das Neves	Capela de Santo André	Medieval foundation. First reference 1546
Bairro da Matriz	Nossa Senhora da Conceição	Igreja Matriz da Póvoa de Varzim	1743–1756
Bairro da Matriz	Nossa Senhora da Conceição	Igreja da Misericórdia da Póvoa de Varzim	1914. Replacing a medieval temple from the 11th century, reused some stonework.
Bairro da Matriz	Nossa Senhora da Conceição	Capela de Nossa Senhora das Dores da Póvoa de Varzim	time immemorial; reconstruction 1779–1880
Bairro da Matriz	Nossa Senhora da Conceição	Basílica do Sagrado Coração de Jesus da Póvoa de Varzim	1890, 1927–1948
Bairro da Matriz	Nossa Senhora da Conceição	Capela de Nossa Senhora de Belém da Póvoa de Varzim	time immemorial, reconstruction: 1826
Bairro da Matriz	Nossa Senhora da Conceição	Capela do Senhor do Bonfim da Póvoa de Varzim	1850. Reformed 1891. Started with a calvary in 1693, transformed into a niche in the 18th century.
Bairro da Matriz	Nossa Senhora da Conceição	Capela de São Sebastião (private)	
Bairro Norte	São José	Igreja Paroquial de São José de Ribamar da Póvoa de Varzim	1960 (neo-Romanesque style), 1970s (neogothic). Replaced older temple.
Bairro Norte	São José	Capela de Nossa Senhora do Desterro	1903 - 1913 rebuilt on the site of an 1870-1880 chapel.
Bairro Norte	São José	Capela de São Roque e Santiago	1582. Reformed in 1887
Bairro Sul	Nossa Senhora da Lapa	Igreja Paroquial de Nossa Senhora da Lapa da Póvoa de Varzim	1770–1772
Bairro Sul	Nossa Senhora da Lapa	Capela de Nossa Senhora da Conceição do Castelo	1701–1743
Balasar	Santa Eulália	Igreja Paroquial de Santa Eulália de Balasar	1892. Replacing an older temple. Reformed 1978.
Balasar	Santa Eulália	Capela da Santa Cruz de Balasar	19th century. Started with a cross in 1832.
Balasar	Santa Eulália	Capela de Nossa Senhora da Lapa da Quinta da Dona Benta (private)	
Beiriz	Santa Eulália	Igreja paroquial de Santa Eulália de Beiriz	1868–1872
Beiriz	Santa Eulália	Capela do Cemitério de Santa Eulália de Beiriz	1878–1881
Estela	Senhora do Ó	Igreja paroquial de Nossa Senhora da Expectação da Estela	1800. Replacing older temple.
Estela	Senhora do Ó	Capela de São Tomé da Estela	new
Laundos	São Miguel	Igreja Paroquial de São Miguel de Laundos	Probably medieval. Changed through the centuries, mostly notably in early 19th century
Laundos	São Miguel	Santuário de Nossa Senhora da Saúde	1825–1845. Reformed 1907.
Laundos	São Miguel	Capela de São Félix de Laundos	1431. Reformed throw the 20th century.
Laundos	São Miguel	Capelinha de Nossa Senhora da Saúde	
Navais	Divino Salvador	Igreja Paroquial de Divino Salvador de Navais	Recorded in the 16th century. Most of the modern building is from 1840 and works in late 19th century.
Navais	Divino Salvador	Capela de Santo António de Navais	1895.
Rates	São Pedro de Rates	Igreja Paroquial de São Pedro de Rates	time immemorial: 6th century or earlier
Rates	São Pedro de Rates	Museu de São Pedro de Rates	
Rates	São Pedro de Rates	Capela de São António de Rates	Time immemorial (First reference 1657). Reformed 1692.
Rates	São Pedro de Rates	Capela de São Marcos de Rates	Already existed in 1758. Site transfer in early 19th century.
Rates	São Pedro de Rates	Capela do Senhor da Praça de Rates	1745
Rates	São Pedro de Rates	Capela do Senhor dos Passos de Rates	First reference 1758. Probably built in the 16th century.
Rates	São Pedro de Rates	Capelinha de Santo António de Rates	1617. Reformed in 1692.
Terroso	Nossa Senhora das Candeias	Igreja Paroquial de Santa Maria de Terroso	16th century. Reformed in 1718. Interiors destroyed in 1975.
Terroso	Nossa Senhora das Candeias	Capela do divino Salvador de Terroso	1670.
Terroso	Nossa Senhora das Candeias	Capela de Santo António de Terroso	1907.
Terroso	Nossa Senhora das Candeias	Capela de São Lourenço de Terroso	1698–1699. Site transfer in 1940.
Terroso	Nossa Senhora das Candeias	Nicho de Santo António de Terroso	
