= Gandra =

Gandra may refer to:

- Gandra (Esposende), a freguesia (parish) in the concelho (municipality) of Esposende, Portugal
- Gandra (Paredes), a parish in the municipality of Paredes, Portugal
- Gandra, a parish in the municipality of Ponte de Lima, Portugal
- Gandra e Taião, a parish in the municipality of Valença, Portugal
- Gandra, Póvoa de Varzim, a hamlet located in the parish of Balazar, Póvoa de Varzim

== See also ==
- Gândara, neighborhood of Póvoa de Varzim, Portugal
