= Gresufes =

Coordinates: 41.4018°N 8.6078°W

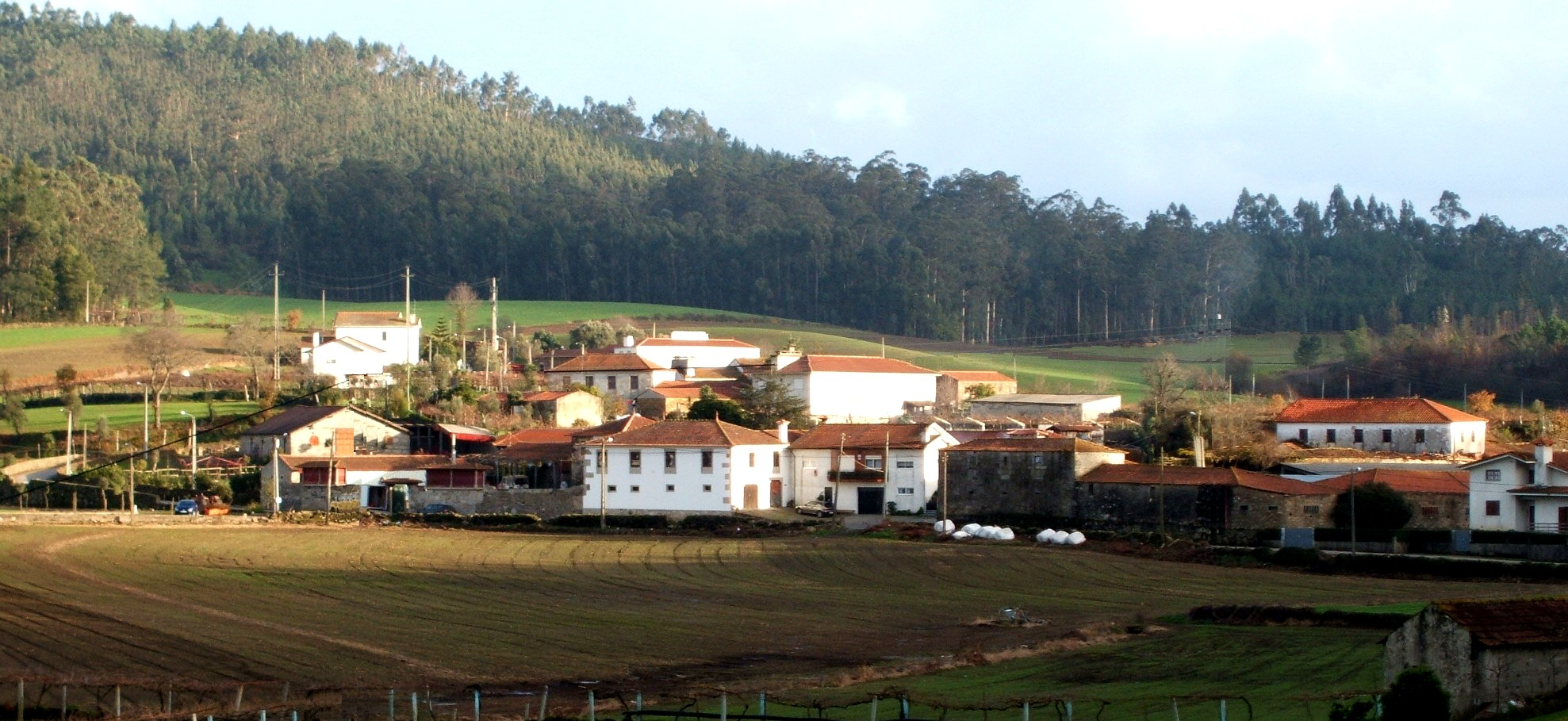
Gresufes

Gresufes is a Portuguese hamlet in the parish of Balasar, Póvoa de Varzim. It lies about 7 kilometres (4.3 mi) west of Vila Nova de Famalicão. Its name is of Suebi origin.

Gresufes was a parish until 1442, when it merged with the neighbouring parish of Casal to form Balasar, named after a small place in the area.

Alexandrina Maria da Costa was born in Gresufes.
