= Pope Pius XII consecration to the Immaculate Heart of Mary =

Pope Pius XII consecration to the Immaculate Heart of Mary may refer to:

- Pope Pius XII 1942 consecration to the Immaculate Heart of Mary
- Pope Pius XII's 1952 consecration of the people of Russia to the Immaculate Heart of Mary in Sacro vergente anno

== See also ==
- Consecration of Russia
