= Calves, Portugal =

Hamlet in Póvoa de Varzim, Portugal

Coordinates: 41°23′N 8°44′W

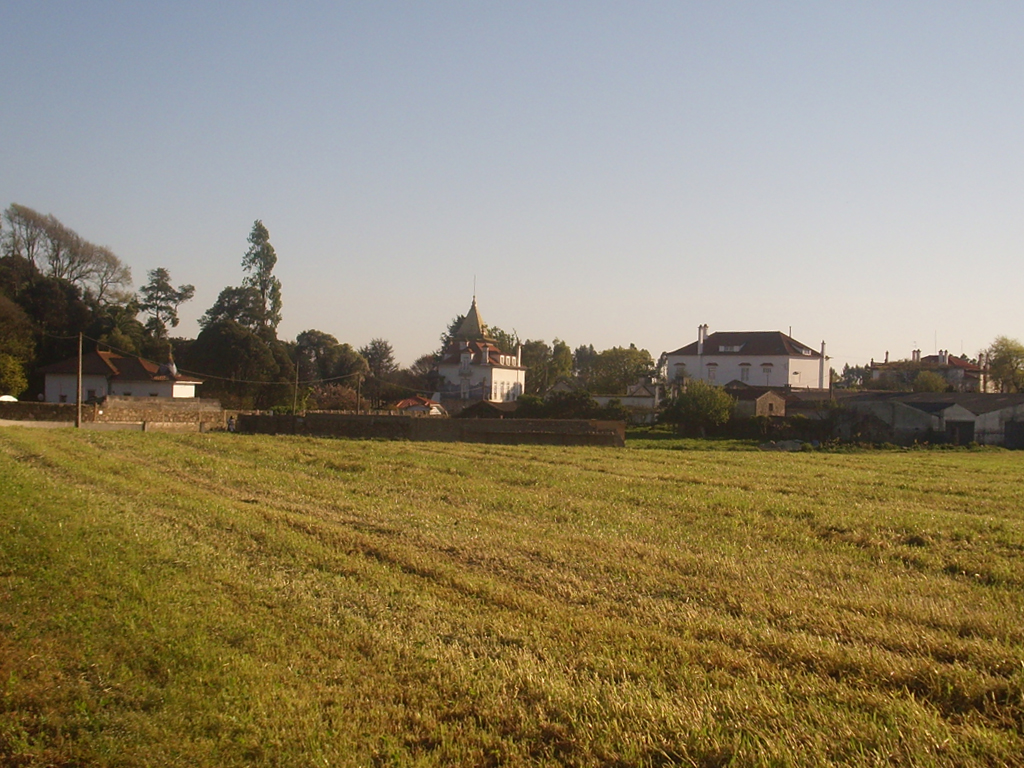
Calves is a picturesque location in the outskirts of Póvoa de Varzim.

Calves is a hamlet in Póvoa de Varzim, Portugal. It is divided between the parishes of Argivai and Beiriz and in the 2001 census it had 138 inhabitants.

== Tapetes de Beiriz ==
The factory of Tapetes de Beiriz ("Beiriz Carpets") is also located there. The operation began in the early 20th century as an idea from Hilda d'Almeida Brandão Rodrigues Miranda, a Portuguese-Brazilian (1892 in Salvador da Bahia – 1949 in Beiriz), who built a small workshop and later a factory together with an assistant, Rita Conceição. They invented the nó de Beiriz ("Beiriz knot").

== Countryside estates ==
Calves is noted as a beauty spot for its countryside estates (Portuguese: Quintas), namely Quinta de Calves and Quinta de Beiriz. Santa Clara Aqueduct is located in Calves.

Quinta de Beiriz is the more notable of the estates. It is a beauty spot realised by Alfredo de Almeida Brandão, a diplomat and a lover of fine arts. The estate includes gardens with two lakes and a park covered by trees, water fountains and mythical statues in the style of André Le Nôtre. The small manor house on the estate was built at the beginning of the 20th century, but several buildings date from the 18th.

In 1956, the chapel was practically destroyed due to vandalism and the woodcarvings were sold, as the owners feared robbery. From 1972, the public rooms and D. Hilda Chapel underwent improvement with Portuguese-Baroque woodcarving, to imitate the 16th- and 17th-century sanctuaries of the Minho region. Azulejos include hunting and countryside motifs. The chapel was reconsecrated in 1993.
