= Pope Pius XII 1942 consecration to the Immaculate Heart of Mary =

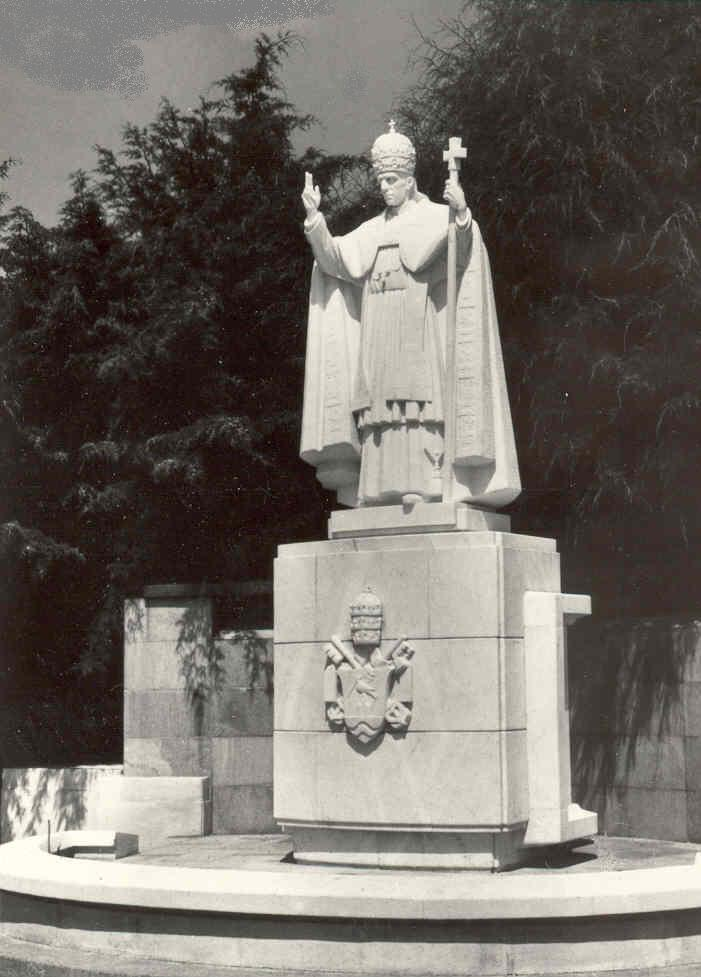
Statue of Pope Pius XII in Fátima, Portugal

Pope Pius XII consecration of the world to the Immaculate Heart of Mary took place on October 31, 1942. Pope Pius XII performed a Marian consecration, entrusting the world to the Virgin Mary, as Queen of Peace, through her Immaculate Heart. This consecration was made in the context of the reported messages from Jesus purportedly received by Blessed Alexandrina of Balazar, in Portugal, and communicated to her spiritual director, the jesuit priest Mariano Pinho.

== Historical context ==
From the beginning of the twentieth century the Holy See received many requests that the world be consecrated to the Immaculate Heart of Mary. An act of consecration to Mary is essentially an act of consecration to Jesus through Mary. According to Pius XII, it "tends essentially to union with Jesus, under the guidance of Mary."

Alexandrina Maria da Costa, from Balazar, was a Portuguese mystic who reported many private apparitions, messages and prophecies received from Jesus and the Virgin Mary. In June 1938, her spiritual director, the jesuit priest Mariano Pinho, conducted a retreat at Fátima, Portugal, for the Portuguese bishops, at the end of which the bishops forwarded a request to Pius XI for the consecration of the world to the Immaculate Heart of Mary. They had themselves consecrated Portugal in May 1931. This request was renewed several times. The Holy See decided to consult with the Archbishop of Braga.

Pius XII had a particular devotion to Mary. On October 31, 1942, Pius XII broadcast a radio address entitled Benedicite Deum to thousands of pilgrims who had come to Fatima to celebrate the Silver Jubilee of the last apparition of Our Lady. Recalling the blessings which have come to Portugal through Mary, Pius XII called for a prayer crusade to Mary the Queen of Peace, and stated that only her intercession could save the situation. He concluded his address by consecrating the whole world to the Immaculate Heart of Mary.

Finally, just as the Church and the entire human race were consecrated to the Heart of your Jesus, ...so, in like manner, they are henceforth perpetually consecrated to you, to your Immaculate Heart, Oh our Mother, and Queen of the world: in order that your love and protection may hasten the triumph of the kingdom of God.

Pius renewed the consecration again on December 8, 1942 at St. Peter’s Basilica.

== Interpretation ==
The noted Mariologist Gabriel Roschini called the 1942 consecration of the human race to the Immaculate Heart of Mary "the greatest honour, which anyone can imagine. It is the highest manifestation of the Marian cult." He and others see the consecration as a new “Marian way”, neither collectivism nor unlimited liberalism. The consecration to Mary by Pope Pius means “that an age of the Church” had begun: Through Mary we understand the super-natural destiny of mankind and every human being.

== See also ==
- Consecration and entrustment to Mary
- Consecration of Russia to the Immaculate Heart of Mary
- Our Lady of Fátima
