= Fontaínhas =

Village in Portugal

Coordinates: 41.415°N 8.650°W

Fontaínhas is a Portuguese village in the civil parish of Balazar in the district of Póvoa de Varzim. It is on the N206 road at the boundary with the parish of Rates.

The Famalicão branch of the Póvoa line reached Fontaínhas station on 7 August 1878 and by 1881 the line from Póvoa de Varzim to Vila Nova de Famalicão was complete. On 31 December 1995 both passenger and goods traffic ceased. Work began in 2007 to resurface the line as a cycle route and footpath, and in 2021 the final section was completed. The route, the Ecopista do Ramal de Famalicão is about 28 kilometres (17 mi) long.
