= Giesteira =

Coordinates: 41.3893453°N 8.742544°W

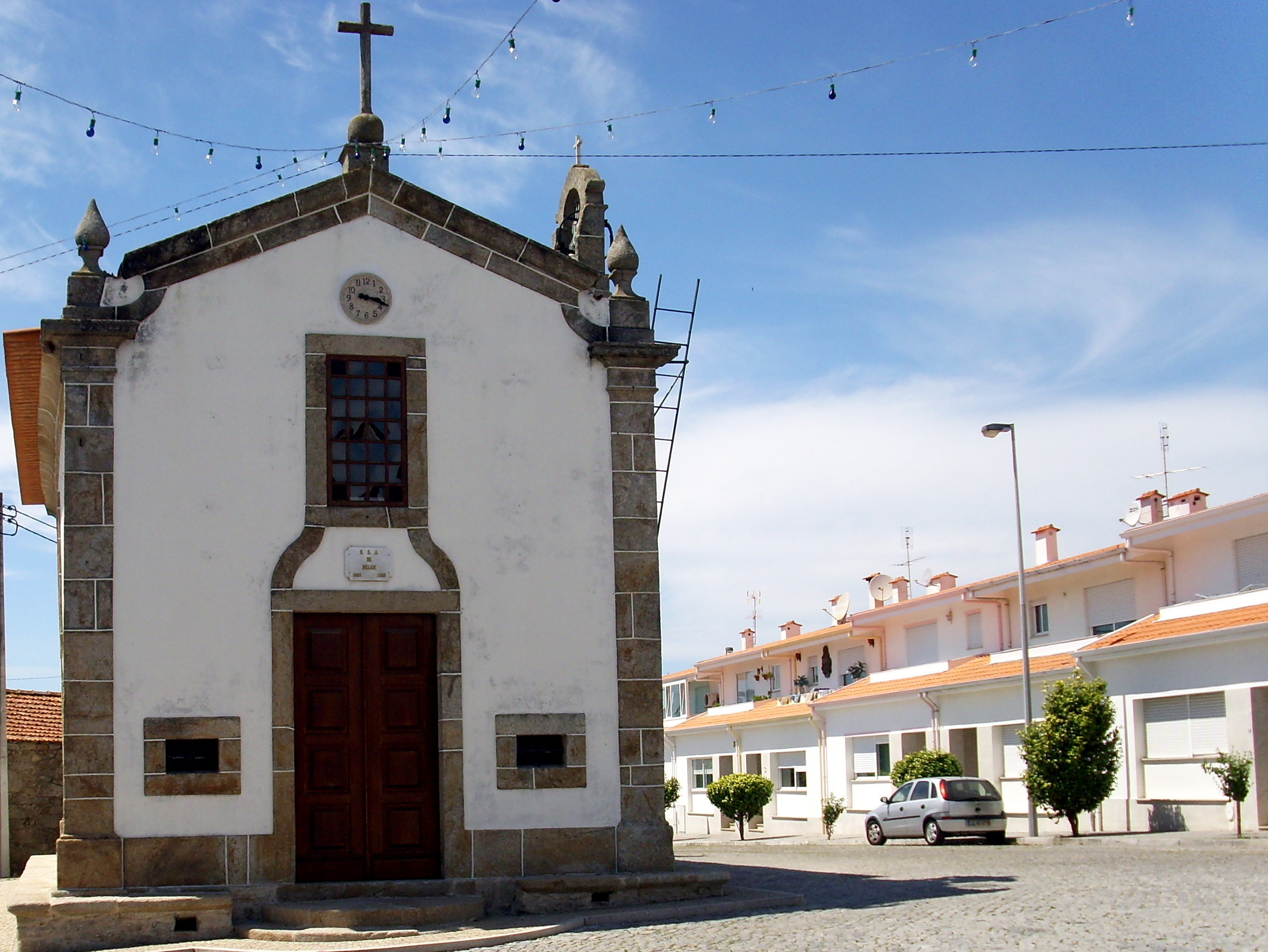
Belém Chapel

Giesteira or Bairro de Belém is a neighbourhood of the Portuguese city of Póvoa de Varzim. It is one of the six traditional neighbourhoods of the city, and one of the eleven city districts. Giesteira is located northeast of the Póvoa de Varzim City Center and subdivided by the parishes of Póvoa de Varzim Parish and Beiriz, most of its land area belongs to Beiriz civil parish.

Giesteira was originally the ancient village of Giesteira in which some of its population moved to populate the new urban center of the Town of Varzim in the 14th century. One of the features of Giesteira are its granite walls that divided the farm fields. In Giesteira it is located the new cemetery of Póvoa de Varzim, while the old one, in Moninhas, is also part of its traditional territory. Archaeological data suggest the existence of a necropolis dating to the Roman period, including a funerary stele in tribute to the god Mars and a pedestal dedicated to Cornelius.

== Família Giesteira ==
Giesteira's Place, still with a rural appearance, is the origin of the surname of the family which operated the Lavradio of their land. The family Giesteira. Core of people and places in Place.

- 1st Generation: Artur Giesteira; Adelaide Amorim
- 2nd Generation: Alda Giesteira; António Giesteira; Domingos Giesteira; Emília Giesteira; José Giesteira; Manuel Giesteira.
- 3rd generation (grandchildren): Adelaide Giesteira; Adelaide Giesteira (2); Alberto Giesteira; Artur Giesteira; Artur Giesteira (2); Bruno Giesteira; Filipe Giesteira; Inês Giesteira; José Giesteira; José Giesteira (2), Manuela Giesteira, Maria José Giesteira; Maria José Giesteira (2), Raquel Giesteira, Tiago Giesteira.
- 4th Generation (great-grandchildren): Bárbara Giesteira; Bárbara Giesteira (2); Carolina Giesteira; Duarte Giesteira; Eduarda Giesteira; Giovana Giesteira; Joana Giesteira; Manuela Giesteira; Martim Giesteira; Miguel Giesteira; Leonor Giesteira; Vitor Giesteira (...)
