= Gestrins =

Human settlement in Portugal

Coordinates: 41.418244°N 8.6385743°W

Gestrins is a Portuguese hamlet located in the parish of Balazar, Póvoa de Varzim.
