= Além =

Coordinates: 41.4062°N 8.6113°W

Além (in English, Beyond) is a Portuguese hamlet located in the parish of Balazar, Póvoa de Varzim with 116 inhabitants (census of 2001).
