= Aguçadoura e Navais =

- Civil parish
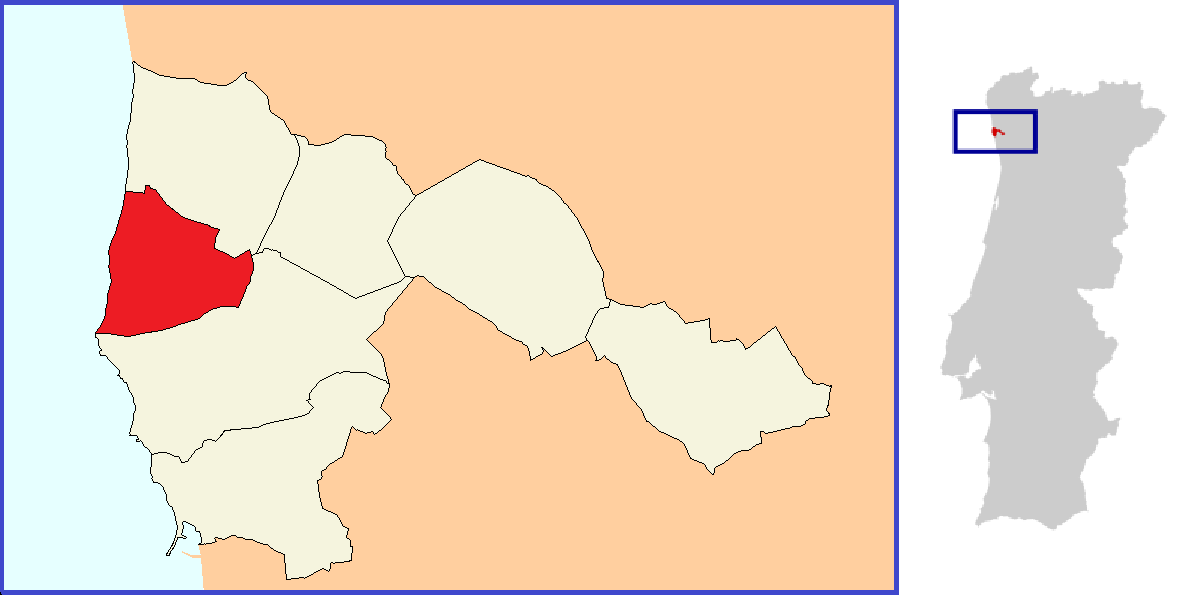
- Coordinates: 41.43°N 8.77°W
- Country: Portugal
- Region: Norte
- Metropolitan area: Porto
- District: Porto
- Municipality: Póvoa de Varzim

Area
  - Total: 7.40 km^{2} (2.86 sq mi)

Population (2011)
  - Total: 5,745
  - Density: 780/km^{2} (2,000/sq mi)
- Time zone: UTC+00:00 (WET)
  - Summer (DST): UTC+01:00 (WEST)

União das Freguesias de Aguçadoura e Navais is one of the seven civil parishes of Póvoa de Varzim, Portugal. The administrative parish was created in 2013 from the former parishes Aguçadoura and Navais and it is the reunification of the two parishes which split in 1933. The population in 2011 was 5,745, in an area of 7.40 km^{2}. Aguçadoura and Navais are farming parishes north of the city of Póvoa de Varzim and both experienced sharp population decline in the 2011 census.

== History ==
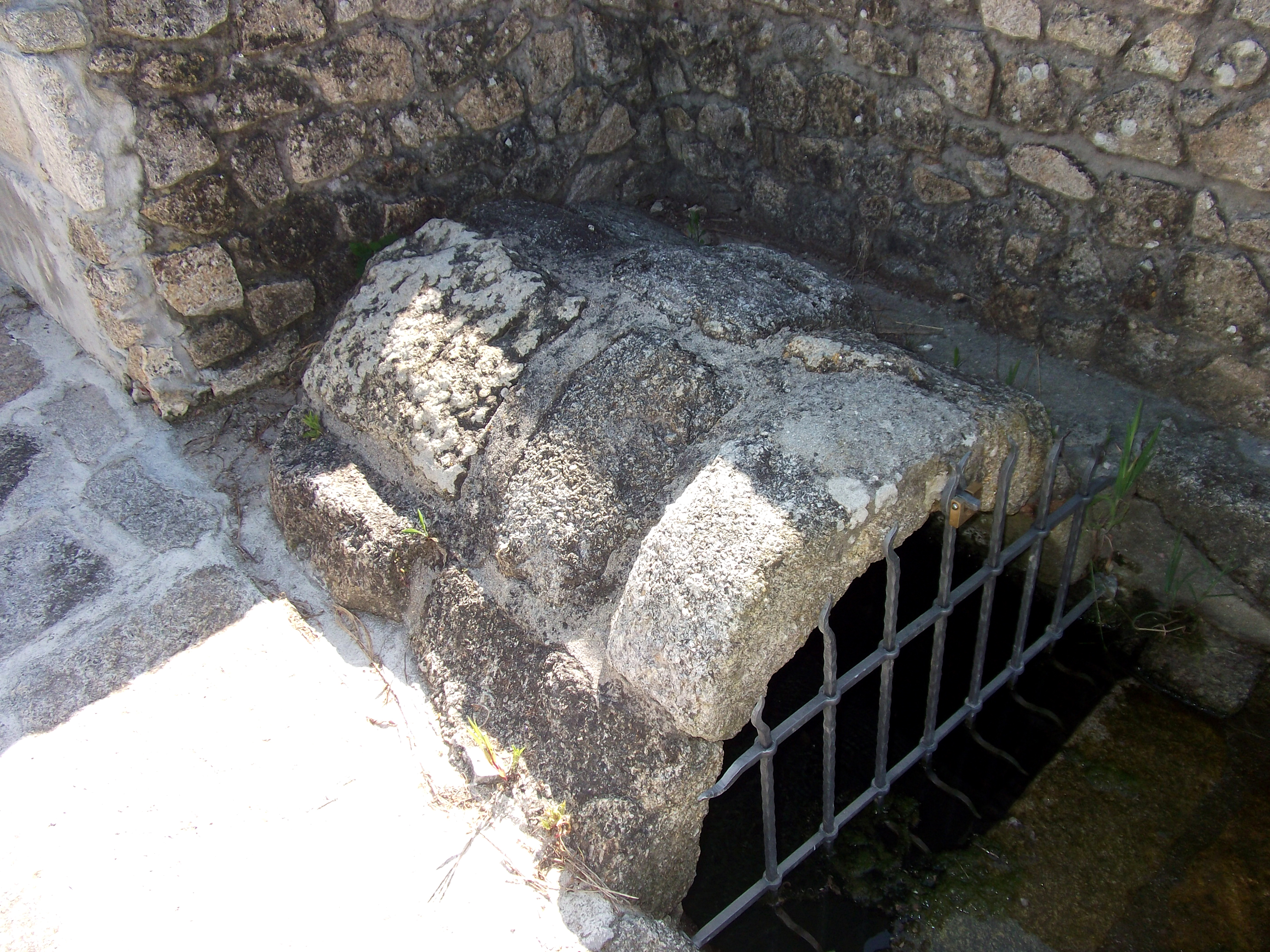
Romanized Castro culture fountain.

Navais is an ancient ecclesiastical parish with known records dating to the 11th century and the naming is known since the 9th century. Navais was created as a civil parish of Póvoa de Varzim in 1836. The civil parish of Aguçadoura was created in 1933, by splitting Navais. Both parishes were reunified in the new administrative unit in 2013.
