= Alexandrina of Balazar =

Portuguese Roman Catholic mystic (1904-1955)

Blessed Alexandrina of Balazar A.S.C.
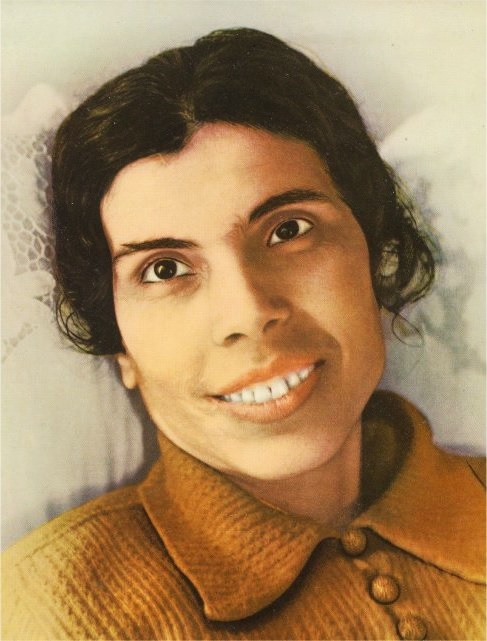
- Portrait of Blessed Alexandrina in a prayer-card

Virgin
- Born: 30 March 1904; Balazar, Póvoa de Varzim, Kingdom of Portugal
- Died: 13 October 1955 (aged 51); Balazar, Póvoa de Varzim, Portugal
- Venerated in: Catholic Church
- Beatified: 25 April 2004, St. Peter's Square, Vatican by Pope John Paul II
- Major shrine: Sanctuary Alexandrina of Balazar (where her body rests)
- Feast: October 13
- Attributes: Member of the Association of Salesian Cooperators

Alexandrina Maria da Costa (30 March 1904 – 13 October 1955), best known as Blessed Alexandrina of Balazar, was a Portuguese mystic and victim soul, member of the Association of Salesian Cooperators, who was born and died in Balazar (a rural parish of Póvoa de Varzim). On 25 April 2004, she was declared blessed by Pope John Paul II who stated that "her secret to holiness was love for Christ".

== Early life ==
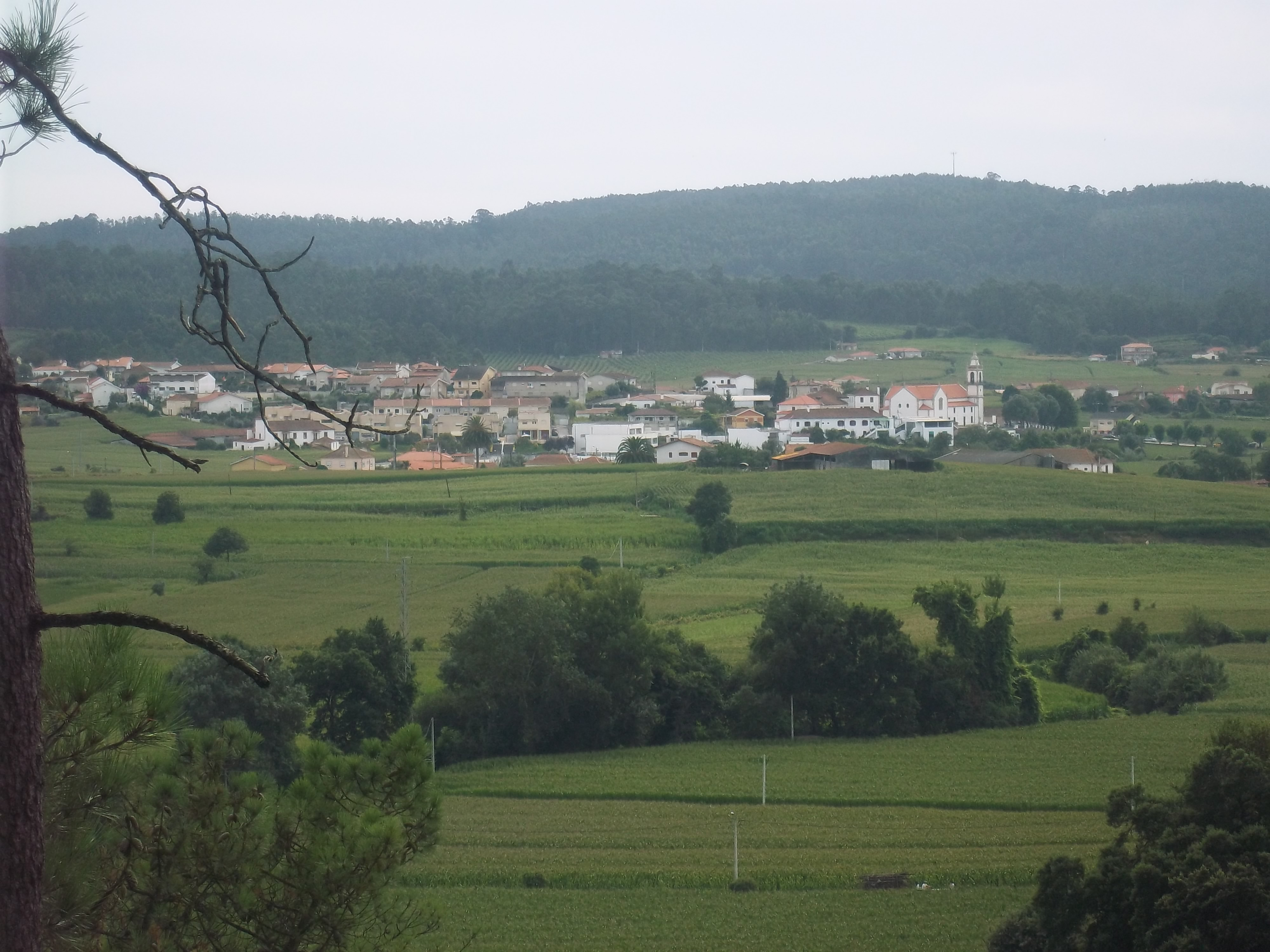
View of Balazar

Alexandrina Maria da Costa was born on 30 March 1904, in Balazar, a rural parish of Póvoa de Varzim, Portugal. Her father abandoned the family when she was very young. She had only eighteen months' schooling before being sent to work on a farm at the age of nine. In her teens she started to work in Balazar as a seamstress along with her sister.

Alexandrina said that when she went with other girls to the countryside, she picked flowers that she later used to make flower carpets for the Church of Our Lady of Sorrows in Póvoa de Varzim.

At 14 years old, in March 1918 an incident changed her life. Her former employer along with two other men tried to break into her room to rape her. To escape them, Alexandrina jumped 13 feet (4.0 m) down from a window, barely surviving. Her spine was broken from the fall. Until age 19, Alexandrina was still able to "drag herself" to church where, hunched over, she would remain in prayer, to the great amazement of the parishioners. During the early years, Alexandrina asked the Blessed Mother for the grace of a cure. She suffered gradual paralysis that confined her to bed from 1925 onward. She remained bed-ridden for about 30 years. The parish priest lent her a statue of the Immaculate Heart of Mary for the month of May.

== Later life ==
In June 1938, based on the request of Alexandrina's confessor, Mariano Pinho, several bishops from Portugal wrote to Pope Pius XI, asking him to consecrate the world to the Immaculate Heart of Mary. This request was renewed several times until 1941, in which the Holy See asked three times for information about Alexandrina to be supplied by the Archbishop of Braga.

In 1938 Cardinal Eugenio Pacelli was the secretary of the state of the Vatican, and he became Pope Pius XII in early March, 1939. In 1942, he performed the consecration of the world.

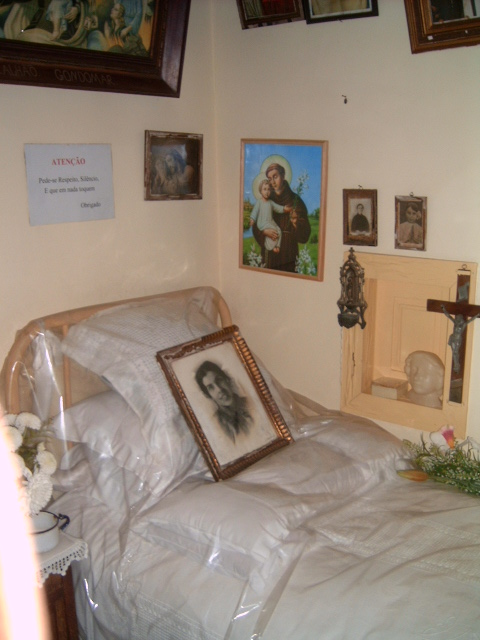
Blessed Alexandrina's bedroom in Balazar.

According to her Vatican biography, from March 1942, for about 13 years until her death, she received no food except for the Holy Eucharist, and her weight dropped to about 33 kilograms (73 lb). She was examined by medical doctors, with no conclusion.

Based on the advice of a priest, her sister kept a diary of Alexandrina's words and mystical experiences. According to her Vatican autobiography, Jesus spoke to her, at one point saying: "You will very rarely receive consolation... I want that while your heart is filled with suffering, on your lips there is a smile". In 1944, she joined the "Union of Salesian Cooperators", offering her suffering for the salvation of souls and for the sanctification of youth.

Umberto Pasquale (1906 – 1985) was a Salesian priest and writer. At the beginning of the 1930s, he went to Portugal and in 1944 he met Alexandrina Maria da Costa, and became her spiritual director.

== Tombstone ==
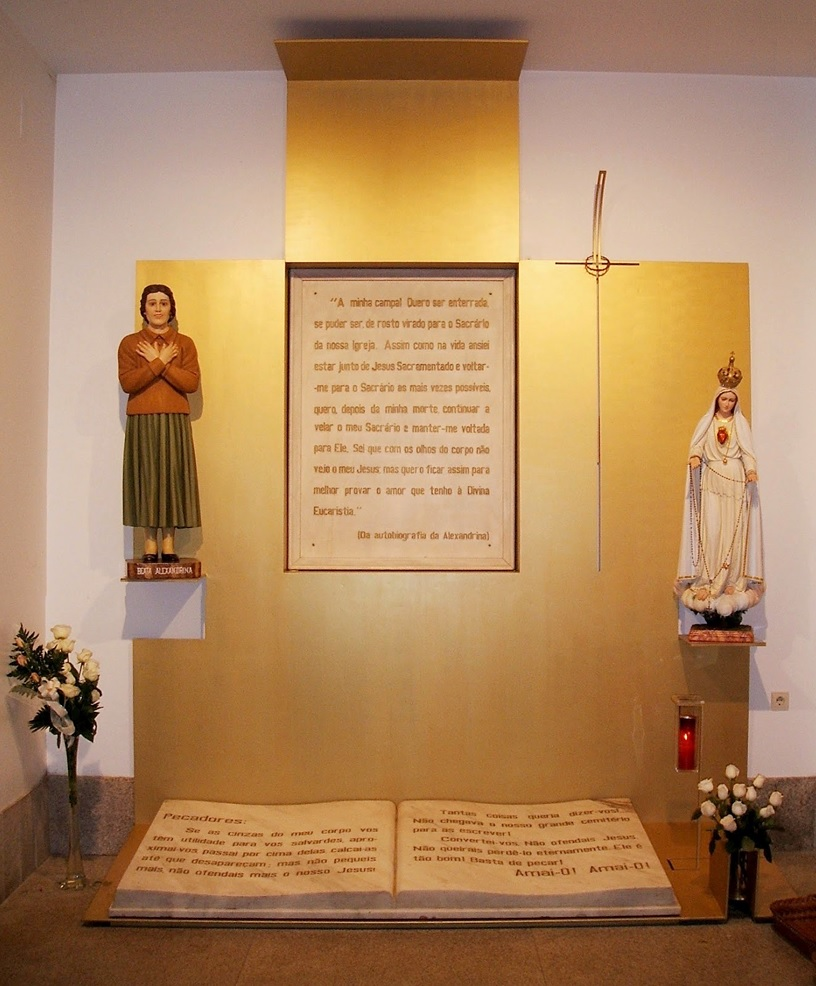
Tomb of Blessed Alexandrina in Balazar.

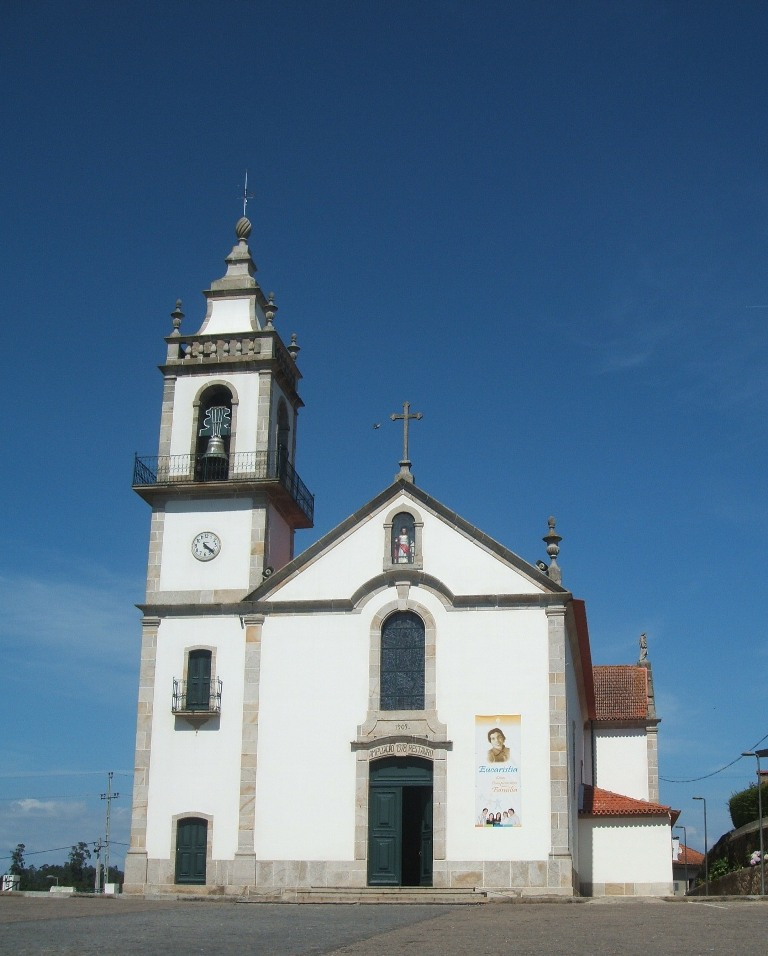
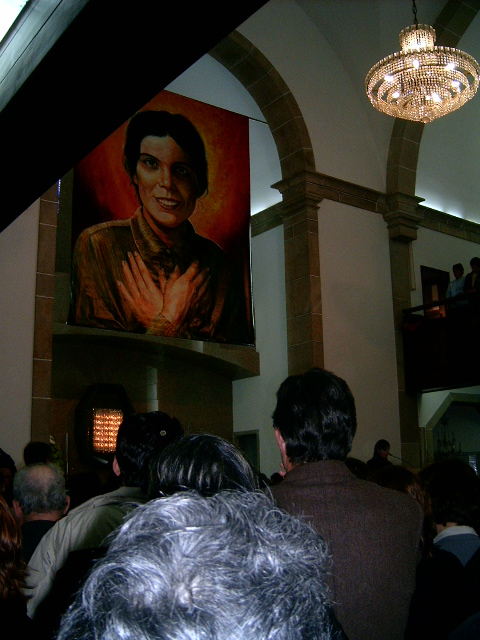
Shrine dedicated to Blessed Alexandrina (in Balazar).

Based on her request, the following words were written on her tombstone:

"Sinners, if the dust of my body can be of help to save you, come close, walk over it, kick it around until it disappears. But never sin again: do not offend Jesus anymore! Sinners, how much I want to tell you.... Do not risk losing Jesus for all eternity, for he is so good. Enough with sin. Love Jesus, love him!".

== See also ==
- Anne Catherine Emmerich
- Faustina Kowalska
- First Thursdays Devotion
- Josefa Menéndez
- Maria Domenica Lazzeri
- Maria Valtorta
- Marie Rose Ferron
- Marthe Robin
- Mary of the Divine Heart
- Tasiusius
- Pope Pius XII 1942 consecration to the Immaculate Heart of Mary
