= Gandra, Póvoa de Varzim =

Portuguese hamlet

Coordinates: 41.3950°N 8.6169°W

Gandra is a Portuguese hamlet located in the parish of Balazar, Póvoa de Varzim.
