= Estela (Póvoa de Varzim) =

- Civil parish
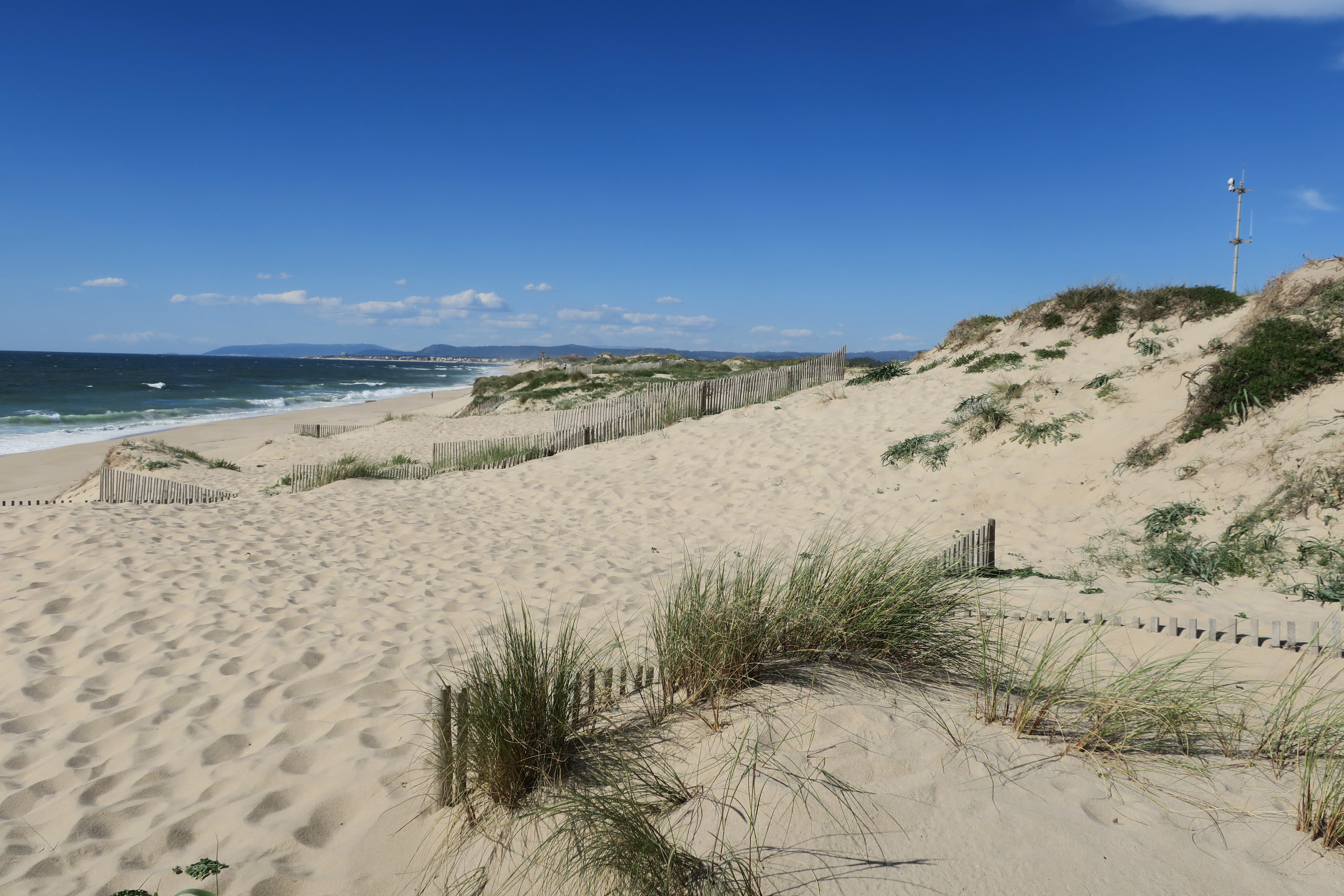

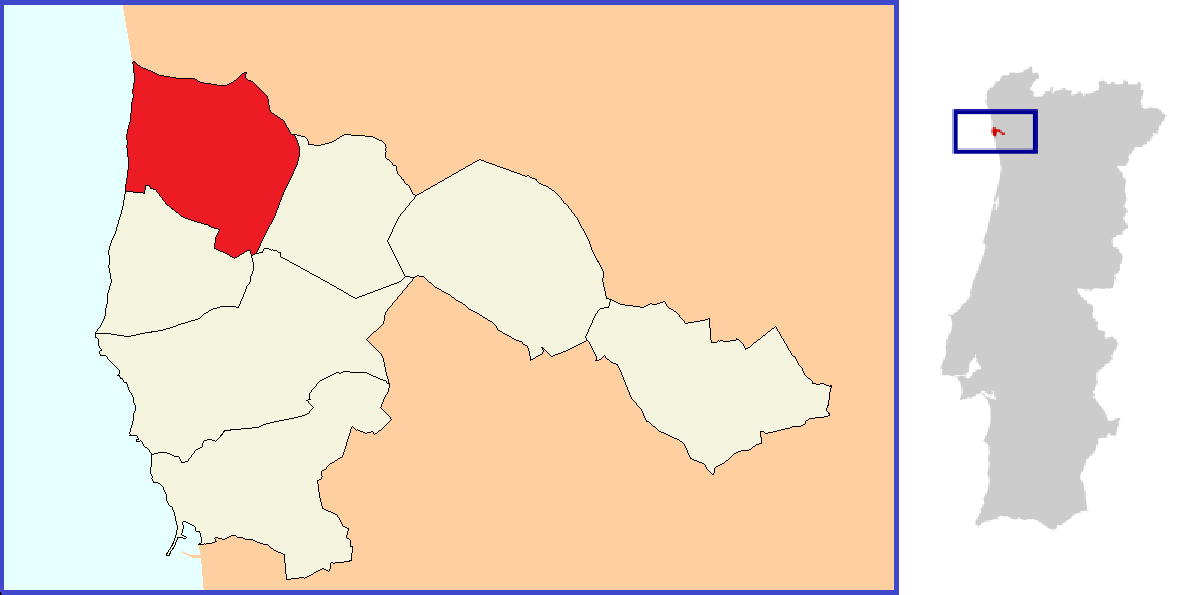
- Coordinates: 41.446°N 8.750°W
- Country: Portugal
- Region: Norte
- Metropolitan area: Porto
- District: Porto
- Municipality: Póvoa de Varzim

Area
  - Total: 11.54 km^{2} (4.46 sq mi)

Population (2011)
  - Total: 2,307
  - Density: 199.9/km^{2} (517.8/sq mi)
- Time zone: UTC+00:00 (WET)
  - Summer (DST): UTC+01:00 (WEST)

Estela is one of the seven civil parishes of Póvoa de Varzim, Portugal. The population in 2011 was 2,307, in an area of 11.54 km².

Estela is known for the traditional masseira farm practice in sand dunes and its name derives from Latin Stella (star). It is the largest agricultural parish of Póvoa de Varzim and, along with Aguçadoura and Navais, it forms the agricultural area of Póvoa de Varzim. These parishes despite having small populations experienced very sharp population declines. The built up area is becoming of suburban nature, due to the fast access to the core of Póvoa de Varzim throw the EN13 highway. Local horticultural formerly consumed regionally is currently exported to other Western European markets. Its large fine sand dune beaches are a popular destination for nudists and holds a notable links golf course in the beachfront.

== History ==
Estela Parish is known since at least the 11th century. The "Couto" letter of the parish of Estela and Villa Mendo dates from 1140 and was given by king Afonso I, the first king of Portugal to the monks of Tibães. It is said, that in this document, King Afonso declares himself by the first time as King of Portugal.

== Geography ==
Estela is located 7 km from the north of Póvoa de Varzim City Center. The north has border with the municipality of Esposende, at east by Laúndos, the south with the parishes of Aguçadoura, Navais, and Terroso and it as a shoreline in the Atlantic Ocean by the west. With the city, Estela is one of the zones most dynamic at tourist level of municipality, there’s a golf course, considered one of the best link courses in Portugal, the camping park and hotels.

In the 18th century, the monks of Tibães planted pinewood, which today characterizes the civil parish of Estela.

=== Localities ===
Contriz, Teso, Urzes, Carrascos, Baldoia, Barros, Frinjo, Fontainha, Carregosa, Igreja, Outeiro, Estrada, and Pedrinha.
