= Laundos =

- Civil parish
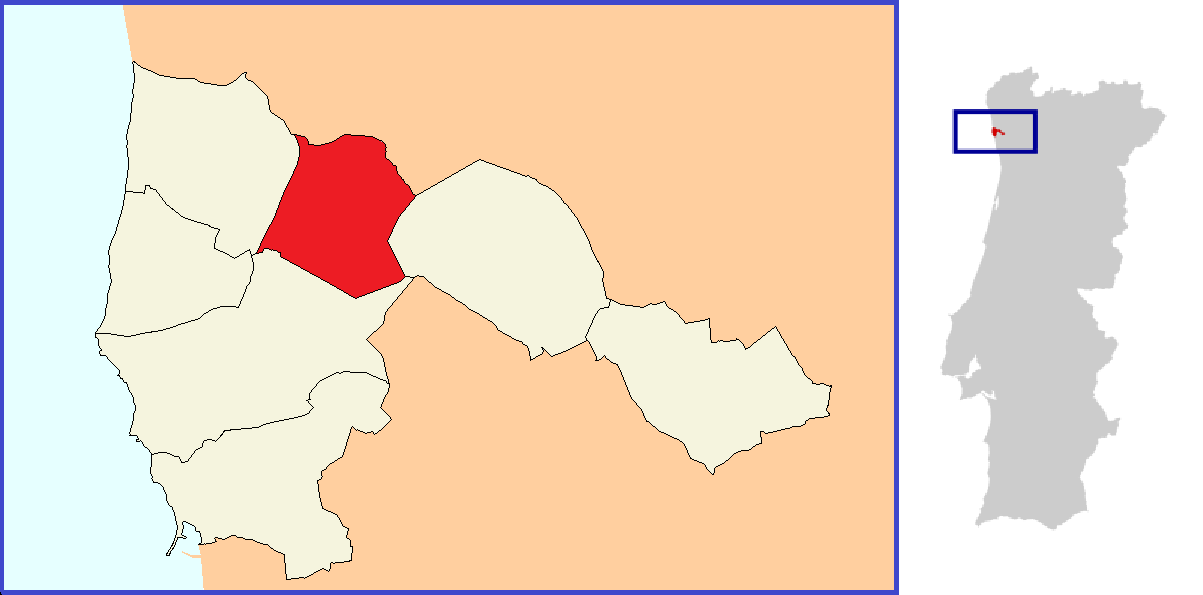
- Coordinates: 41.434°N 8.723°W
- Country: Portugal
- Region: Norte
- Metropolitan area: Porto
- District: Porto
- Municipality: Póvoa de Varzim

Area
  - Total: 8.53 km^{2} (3.29 sq mi)

Population (2011)
  - Total: 2,055
  - Density: 240/km^{2} (620/sq mi)
- Time zone: UTC+00:00 (WET)
  - Summer (DST): UTC+01:00 (WEST)

Laundos or Laúndos is one of the seven civil parishes of Póvoa de Varzim, Portugal. The population in 2011 was 2,055, in an area of 8.53 km^{2}. The name was first documented in 1033 as Montis Lanutus referring to São Félix Hill.

== History ==
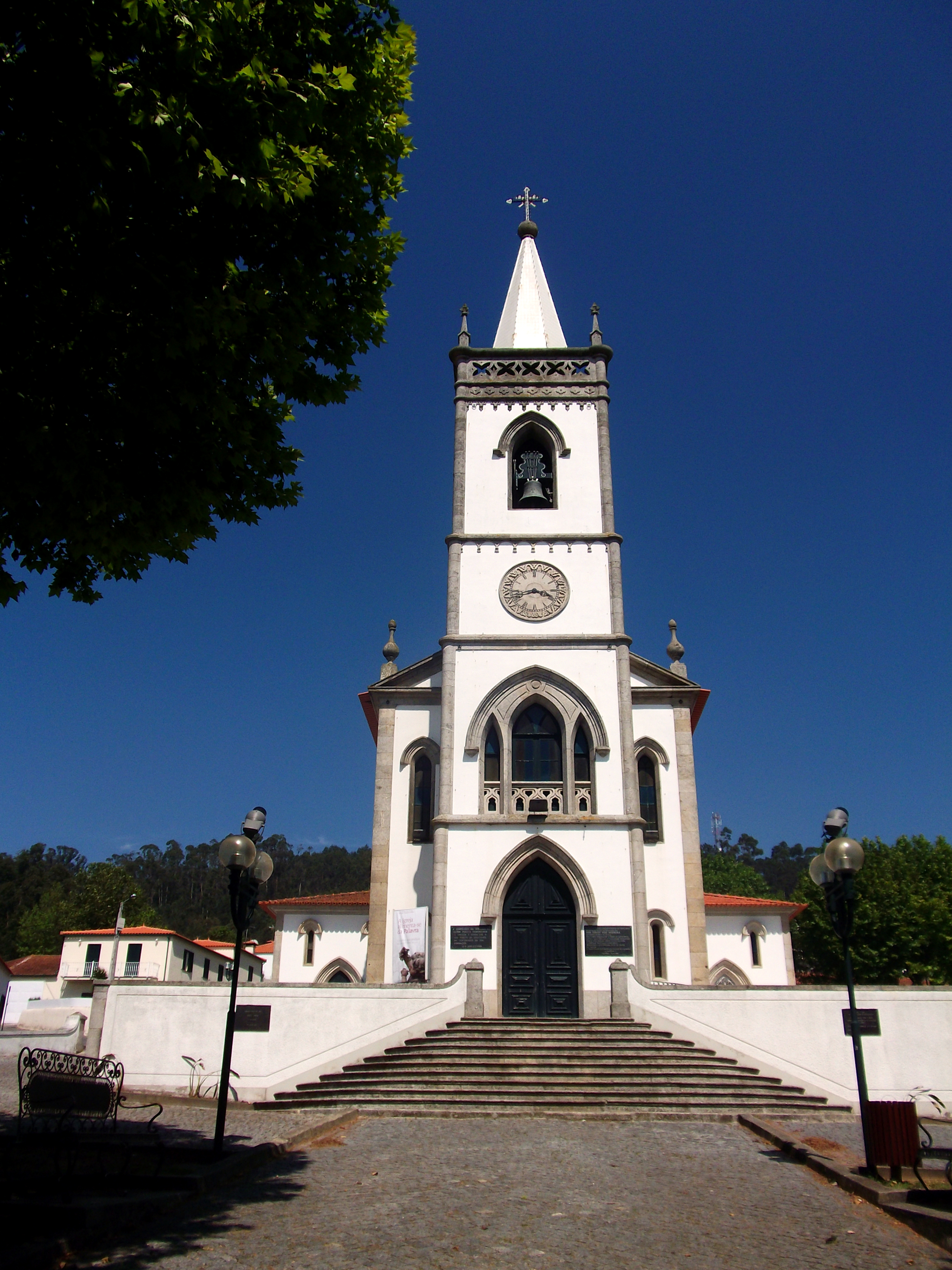
Sanctuary of Our Lady of Health.

Its arid soil didn't help in developing an appropriate Castro town like in neighbouring Cividade Hill in the parish of Terroso despite its rise, but Castro ruins from the 2nd century BC are known, probably a north surveillance post of Cividade de Terroso. Ancient Castro culture jewellery were found complete and are important for the jewel history of North-western Iberian Peninsula.

This is an ancient parish, existing from time immemorial, as it already existed in the 11th century. During the Middle Ages it was the border of Varzim. In the modern period and until 1836, the parish was part of Barcelos, when it was transferred to Póvoa de Varzim.

== Geography ==
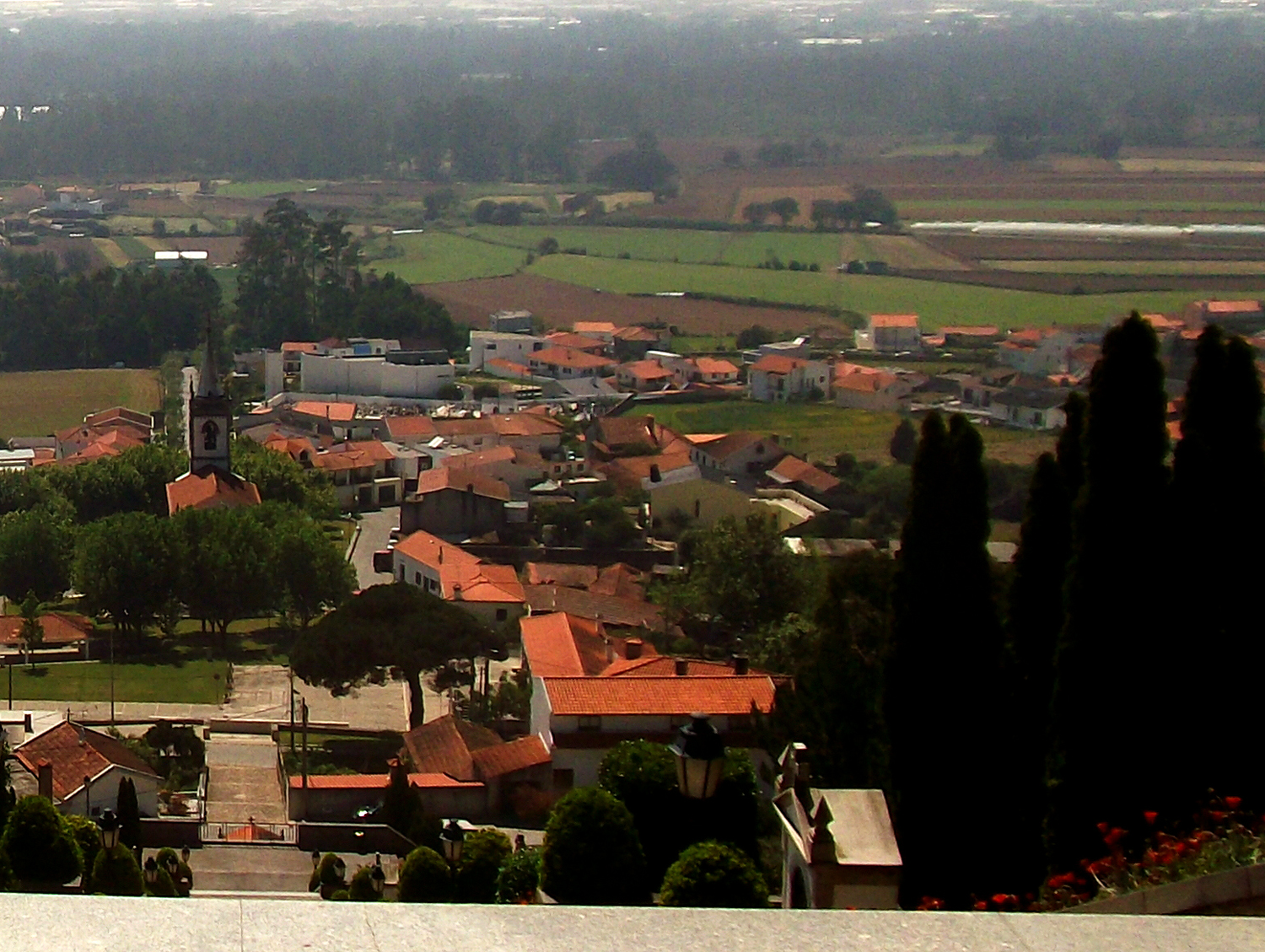
Hamlet of Senhora da Saúde as seen from the summit of São Félix Hill.

Laundos is located 7.5 km east of downtown Póvoa de Varzim in the extreme point of "Póvoa's league" (Légua da Póvoa). During the Middle Ages, along with Cividade Hill, it is often referenced as the medieval border of Varzim (subtus mons Lanudos). It borders Rates to the east, Estela, Terroso and the municipality of Vila do Conde to the south.

The parish is crowned by São Félix Hill (202 m, 663 ft), the peak of Póvoa de Varzim. Despite the modest rise, the expanse of the plain makes this an easy reference point on the horizon. During the Middle Ages, Saint Félix would have lived and meditated in this hill, the legends says, he found the body of Saint Peter of Rates from it. The São Félix Hill, in fact, is the best site to see the municipality of Póvoa de Varzim as a whole and is often used for that.

=== Localities ===
Águas Férreas, Machuqueiras, Laúndos, Recreio, Pé do Monte, Senhora da Saúde, Real, Igreja, and Rapijães.
