= Navais =

Coordinates: 41.431°N 8.762°W

Navais is a parish and former civil parish in Póvoa de Varzim, Portugal. In the census of 2001, it had a population of 1,683 inhabitants and a total area of 4.23 km². A 2013 law amalgamated it into the new União das Freguesias de Aguçadoura e Navais.

== History ==
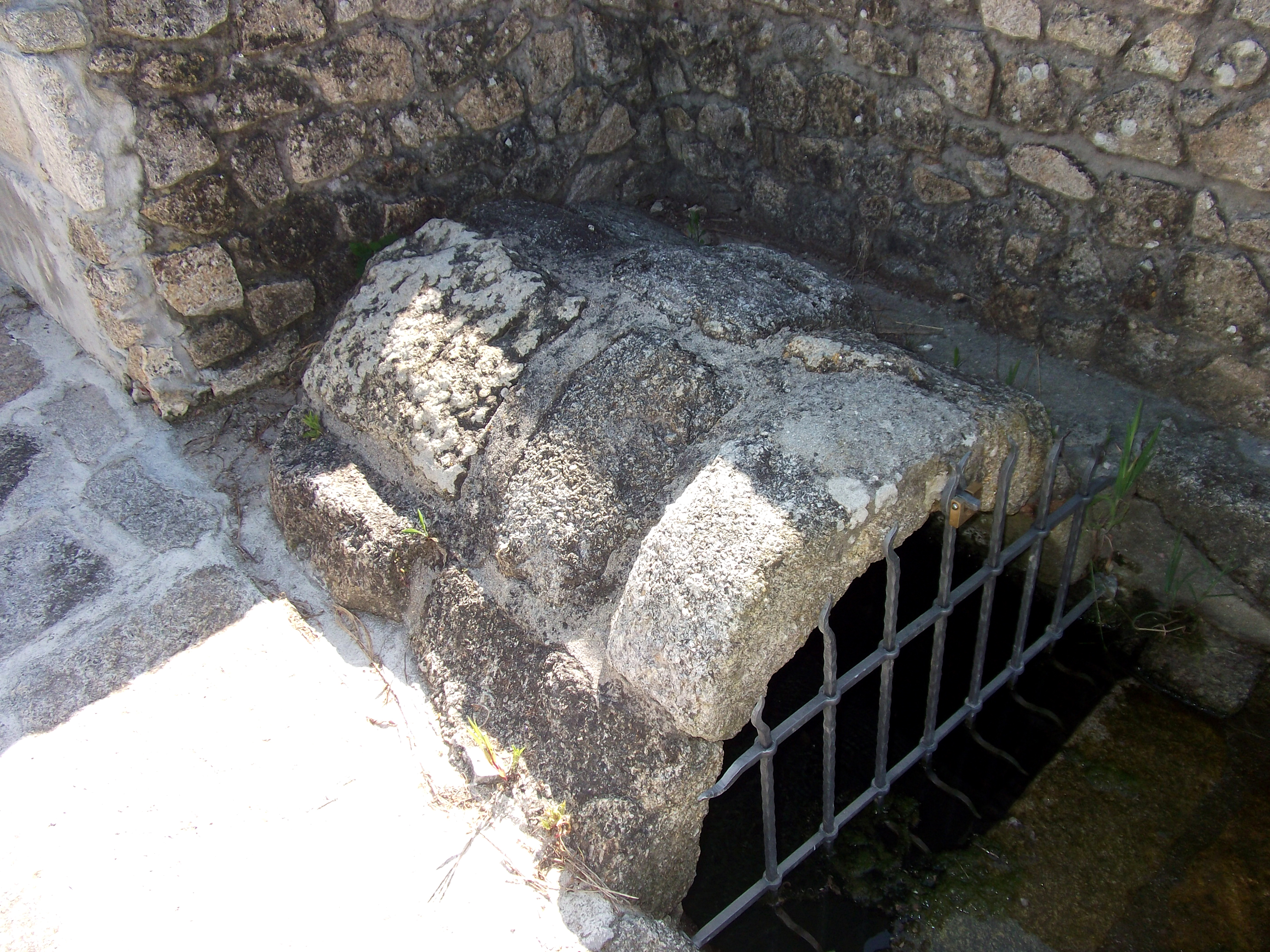
Romanized Castro culture fountain.

Until it became a civil unit in 1836, it was located in Barcelos, and transferred to Póvoa de Varzim ever since. It is an ancient parish, and it already existed in the 11th century. It was already known in the 9th century as Nabales. The Outeiro do Castro is inhabited from time immemorial, and there always had been legends surrounding its land, such as of the Enchanted Moura (a pagan deity), witches and magical oxen.

In 1933, the hamlet of Aguçadoura became an independent parish.

== Geography ==
Navais is located 5.6 km north of downtown Póvoa de Varzim; and borders Estela to the north, Aguçadoura to the west, Terroso to the east and Amorim and A Ver-o-Mar to the south.

=== Hamlets ===
Espadelos, Burgada, Cabreira, Crasto, Navais, Espinhal, Sonhim, Prelades, and Agra de Bouças.
