= Aguçadoura =

Coordinates: 41.431°N 8.777°W

Aguçadoura is a Portuguese freguesia ("civil parish") and former civil parish located in Póvoa de Varzim. In the census of 2001, it had a population of 4,530 inhabitants and a total area of 3.47 km^{2}. A 2013 law amalgamated it into the new União das Freguesias de Aguçadoura e Navais.

The name of Aguçadoura derives from "petra aguzadoira" (sharp stone or stone to sharp farming tools).

== History ==
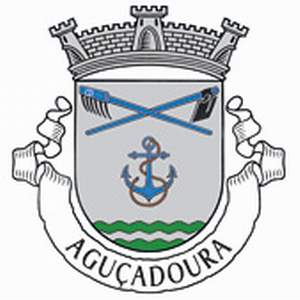
Shield used during periods while it was a civil parish.

Aguçadoura is the newest parish of Póvoa de Varzim; it was created on October 14 of 1933, when it separated from the parish of Navais, to which it always belonged. The first reference to the place appears in 1258: in Petra Aguzadoira que est in termino de Nabaes.

The inhabitants had a difficult time settling in the area, and it was only constituted by sand dunes that were constantly blown by the wind. Only in the 18th century, the settlement gained some importance and, in 1730, there were already 25 families, and in middle of the 19th century its population was greater than that of Navais. Thus Aguçadoura separated from Navais in 1933.

== Geography ==
Aguçadoura is located 6 km north of downtown Póvoa de Varzim; and has as borders: the ocean to the west, and the parishes of Estela to the north, Navais to the east, and A Ver-o-Mar to the south. This parish is recognized for its beaches: Aguçadoura Beach, Codicheira Beach and Barranha Beach.

Its territory once dominated by Masseira farm fields is now dominated by green houses. The parish is very competitive in the garden crops sector, despite most of the parish is located in former arid sandy dunes. Fertilization of its soils was done through generations of farmers by gathering sargassum seaweed from the ocean, to fertilize the infertile soil. The parish is home to Póvoa de Varzim Horticulture Association - the Horpozim. Among other small businesses, there is also a minor floriculture business.

=== Hamlets ===
The parish is divided in seven hamlets: Santo André, Granjeiro, Caturela, Fieiro, Areosa, Aldeia, and Codicheira.

The main beach is also considered to be one of the top surf sites along the Portuguese coastline according to some sources.
