= Beiriz =

Coordinates: 41.397°N 8.723°W

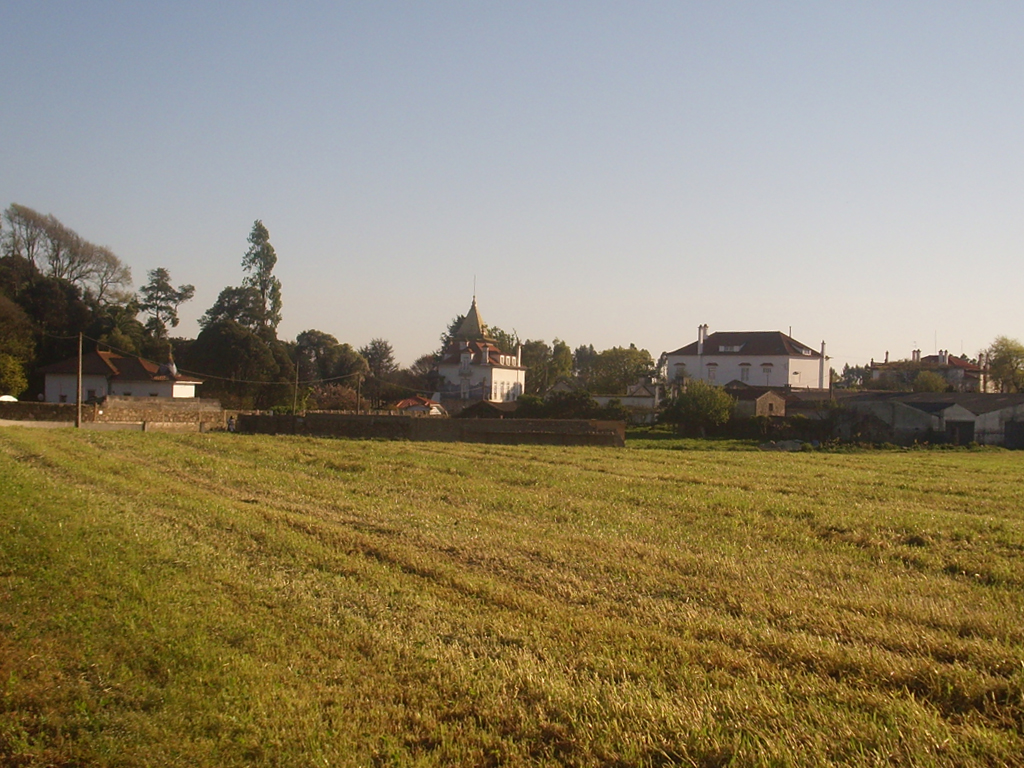
Calves in Beiriz.

Beiriz is a suburban area in Póvoa de Varzim, Portugal. It is an ancient ecclesiastical parish and former civil parish. In the census of 2001, it had a population of 3,229 inhabitants and a total area of 4.31 km^{2}. A 2012 law merged the parish with neighbouring Póvoa de Varzim (parish) and Argivai, becoming the southern parish of the city of Póvoa de Varzim, known as União das Freguesias da Póvoa de Varzim, Beiriz e Argivai.

Beiriz is known for its Tapetes de Beiriz (Beiriz carpets).

== History ==
Beiriz has origins in a medieval rural place known as Villa Viarizi as it is known by a document from 1044. The parish is very old, and it is known to exist from at least from this century onwards. It was a (religious) parish in Barcelos until 1836 when it became a civil unit and was transferred to Vila do Conde. Póvoa de Varzim and Vila do Conde made parish transfers in 1853, and Beiriz was made part of Póvoa de Varzim since then.

== Geography ==
Beiriz is located 4 km from downtown Póvoa de Varzim. Due to its unusual borders and border dispute with parishes in its vicinity: Póvoa de Varzim (Parish), Amorim and Aver-o-Mar, part of the parish is located in the city core, while most of it is in the suburban area of the city.

=== Hamlets ===
The hamlets of the parish are Penouces, Arroteia, Giesteira, Paredes, Calves, Mau Verde, Silvas, Penela, Xisto, Beiriz de Baixo, Outeiro, Igreja, Fraião, Pedreira, Cutéres, Quintã, and Fonte Nova.

=== City districts ===
Part of the parish (Penouces, Arroteia, Giesteira, and part of Paredes) is included in Giesteira district of the city.
