= Rates (Póvoa de Varzim) =

Parish of the municipality of Póvoa de Varzim in Portugal

- Civil parish
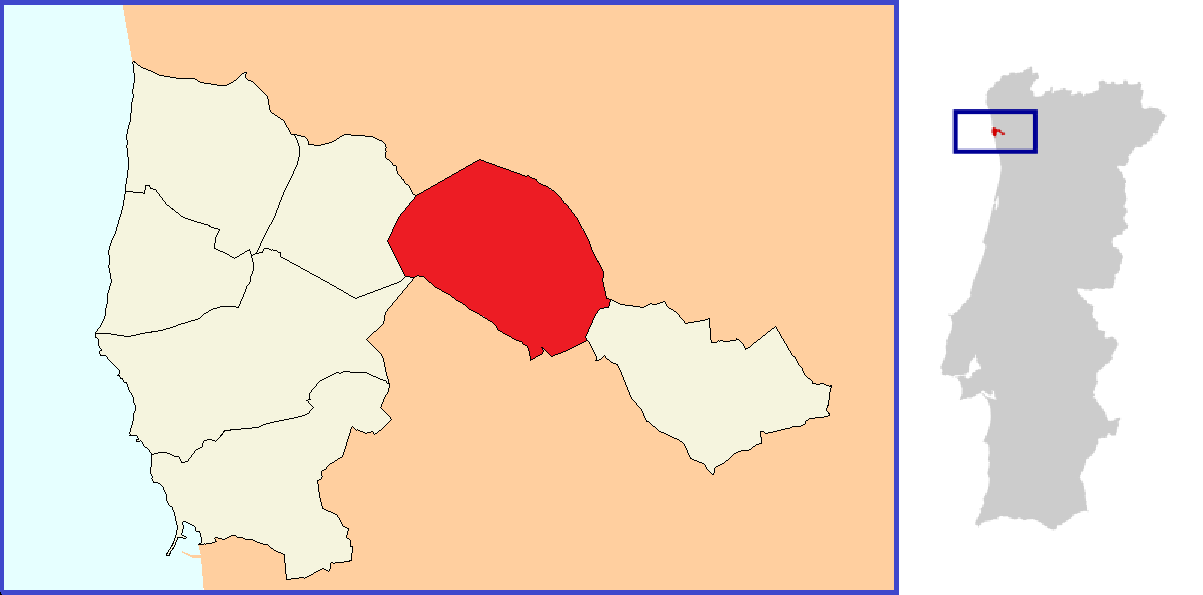
- Coordinates: 41.408°N 8.626°W
- Country: Portugal
- Region: Norte
- Metropolitan area: Porto
- District: Porto
- Municipality: Póvoa de Varzim

Area
  - Total: 13.90 km^{2} (5.37 sq mi)

Population (2011)
  - Total: 2,505
  - Density: 180/km^{2} (470/sq mi)
- Time zone: UTC+00:00 (WET)
  - Summer (DST): UTC+01:00 (WEST)

Rates (Portuguese pronunciation: [ˈʁatɨʃ]) is a Portuguese parish and a former township located in the municipality of Póvoa de Varzim. The population in 2011 was 2,505, in an area of 13.90 km^{2}. The township has records dating to the 13th century and, still today, it preserves landmarks such as the townsquare and a well-preserved and notable Romanesque temple.

== History ==
Rates is a medieval township that developed around the Monastery of Rates, established by Henry, Count of Portugal in 1100 AD on the site of an older temple dating to the 9th century or earlier and with sculpture elements dating to the Roman empire. A Roman road crossed near the monastery.

Rates naming seems pre-Roman in origin. The town gained importance due to the legend of Saint Peter of Rates, mythical first bishop of Braga and martyr while attempting to convert Roman pagans to Christianity, becoming in a central place in the Portuguese Way of Saint James. The local myth was used by the archbishops of Braga to justify their primacy in Hispania, by claiming that an older Christian tradition existed in the city than in other places.

Rates township, a municipality, already existed in the 13th century and the ecclesiastical parish exists from time immemorial, while the earliest record dating to the 11th century.

In the 16th century, the monastery was dissolved and a commendation of the Order of Christ was created. Its first knight commander was Tomé de Sousa, who John III of Portugal made the first Governor of Brazil.

The town was extinct as it lost its municipal status in 1836 and was annexed to Póvoa de Varzim. It then became just a simple civil parish, and gained town status on July 2, 1993, due to its historical importance. however, the new status is merely honorary in nature and has no administrative significance.

General details

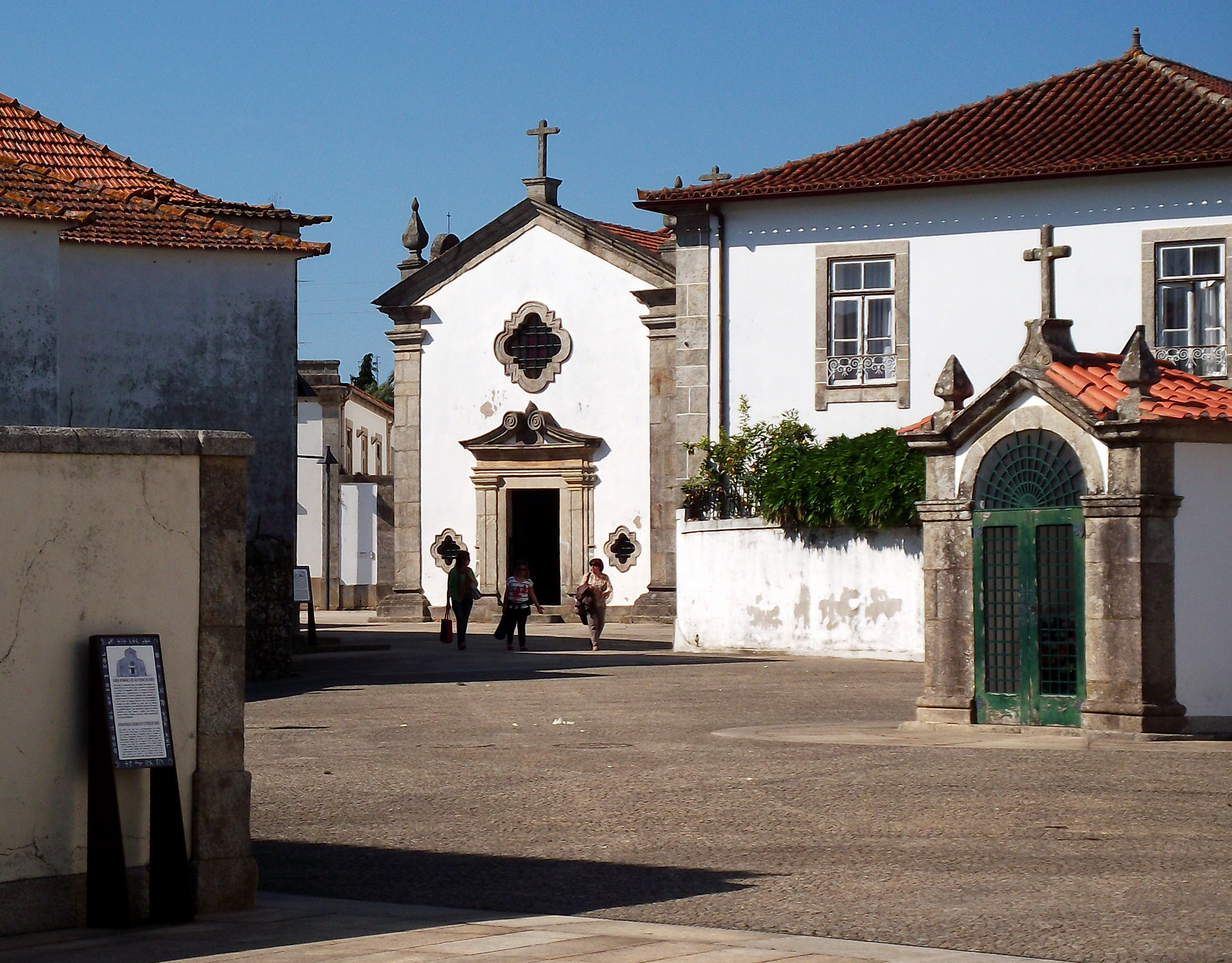
Chapels as seen from the monastery

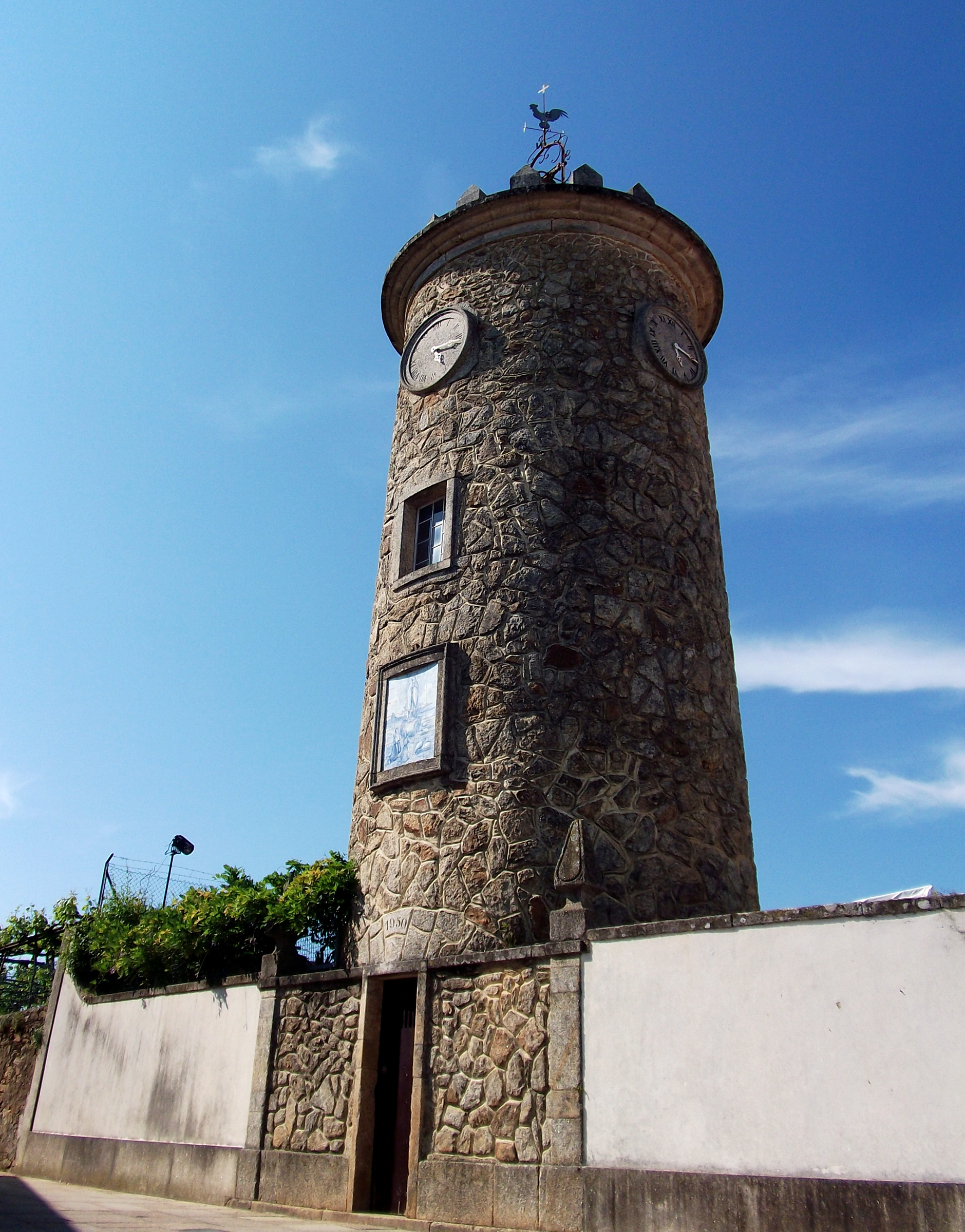
Clock tower

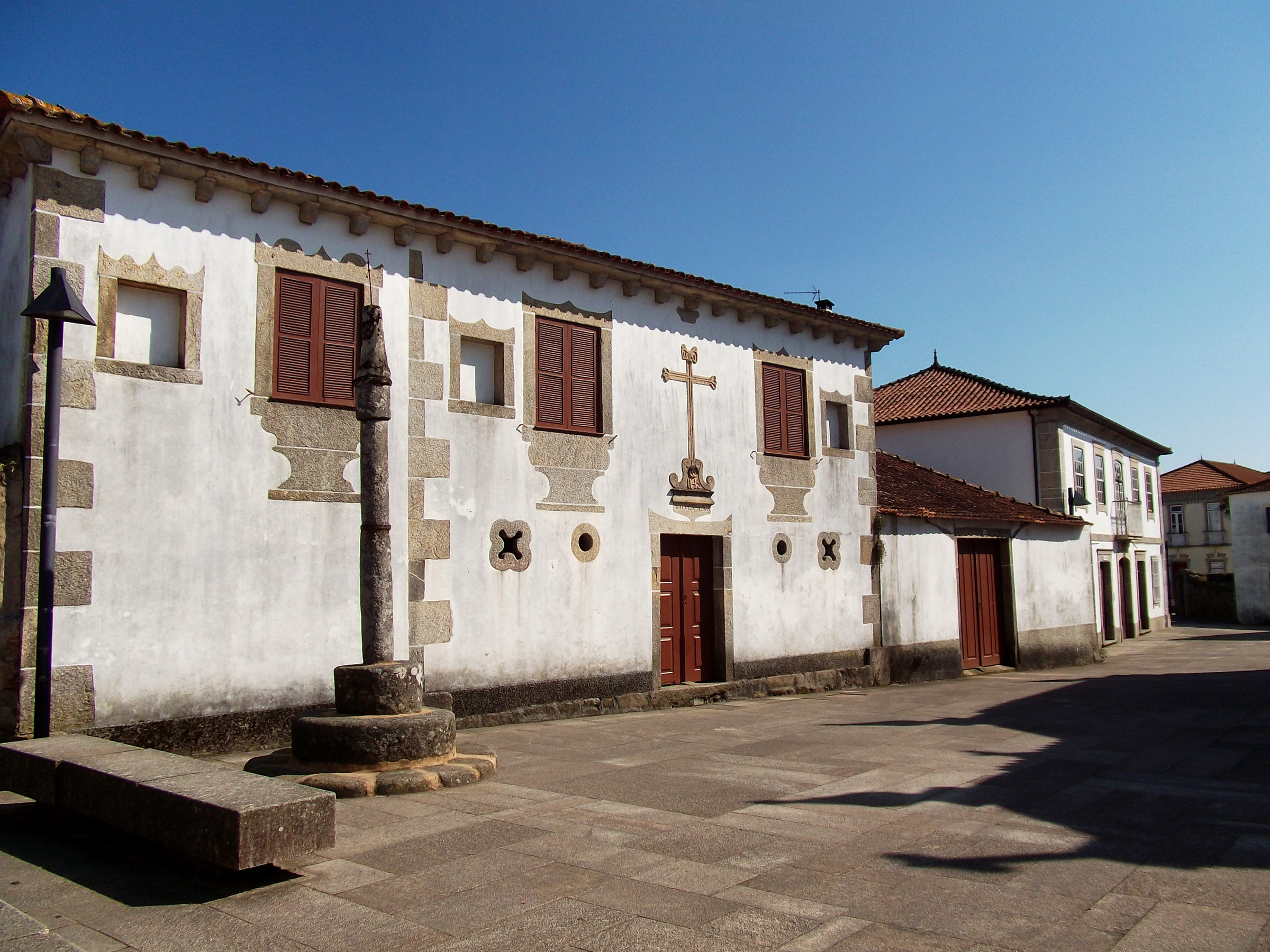
Former town hall and pillory

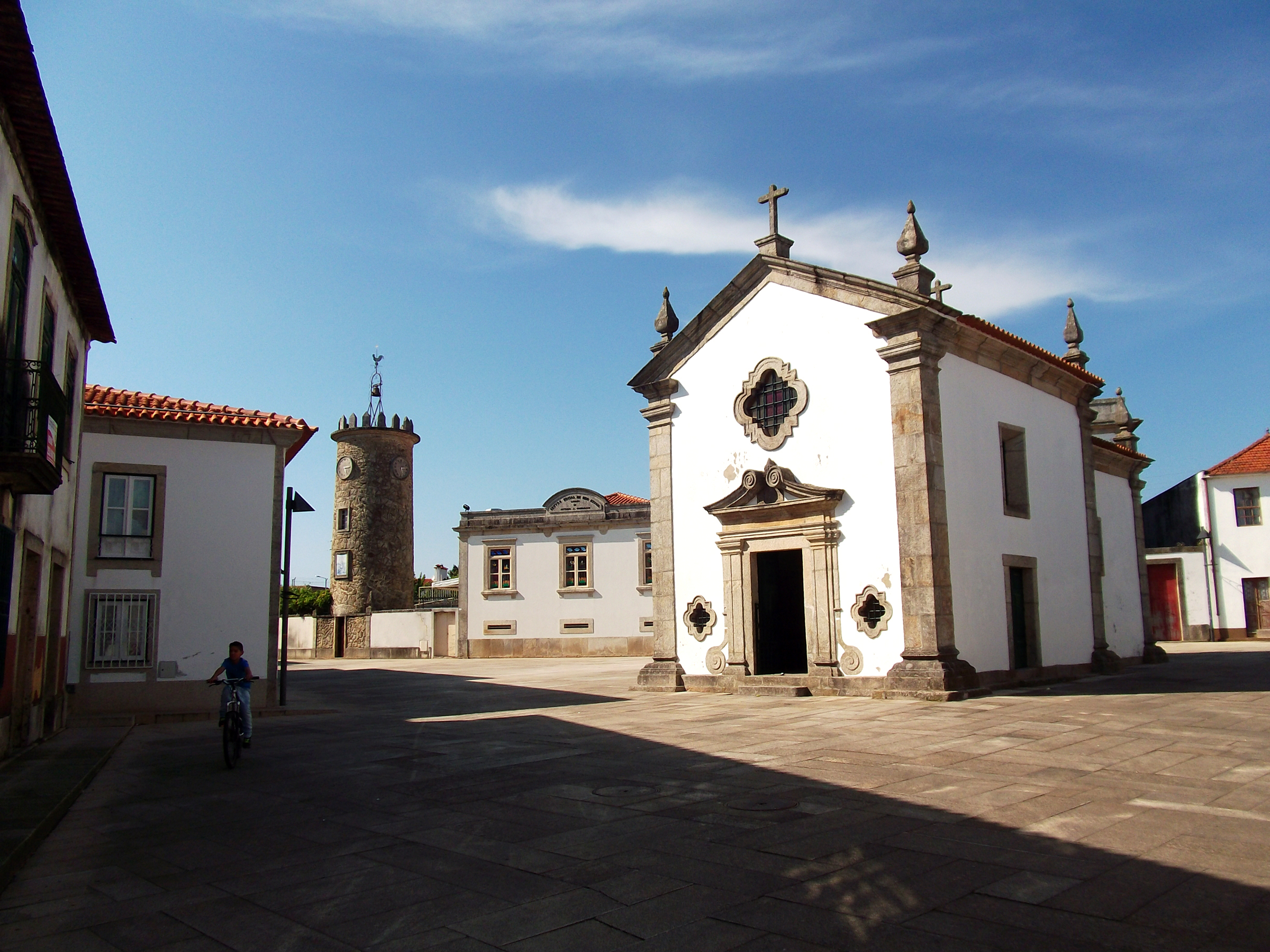
The main square of Rates

== Geography ==
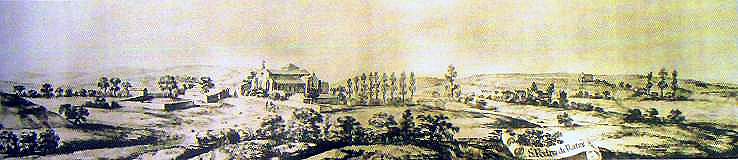
São Pedro de Rates in 1669 by Pier Maria Baldi, drawn during the pilgrimage of future Grand Duke Cosimo III de' Medici to Santiago de Compostela

Rates is located 11 km east of downtown Póvoa de Varzim; and borders Laundos to the west, and Balasar to the east. In the northeast it has a border with Barcelos and to the south with Vila do Conde.

The parish is dominated by Serra de Rates, whose flora is distinguished by the Pedunculate Oak or the European Holly.

The entire town is centred on the monastery of Rates. Its historical centre is very well preserved, and it runs to Direita street, where the nobles and the bourgeoisie of the town used to live.

== Architecture ==
- São Pedro de Rates Church (12th century building listed as National Monument)
- Pillory of Rates (listed property of public interest)
- Senhor da Praça Chapel (Baroque architecture)
