= Argivai =

Coordinates: 41.376°N 8.732°W

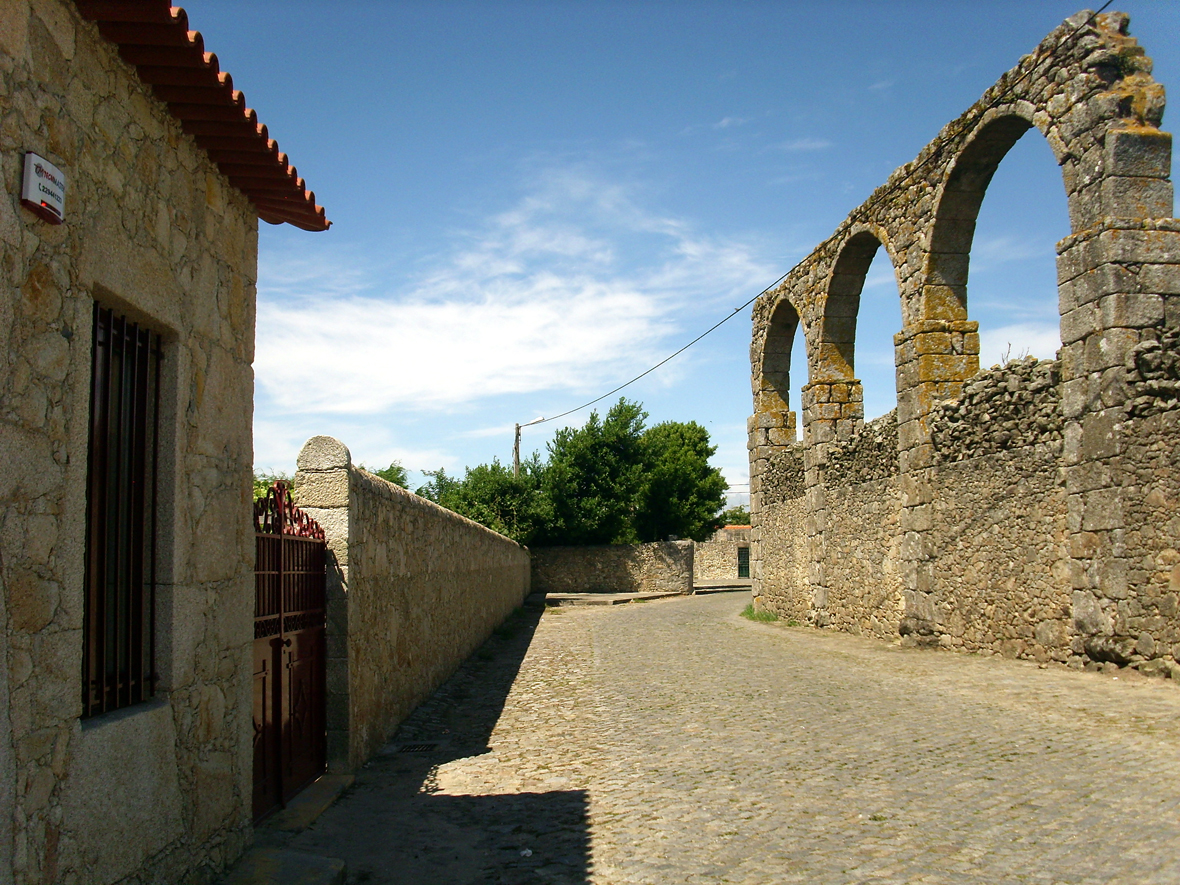
Arcos street in Argivai parish.

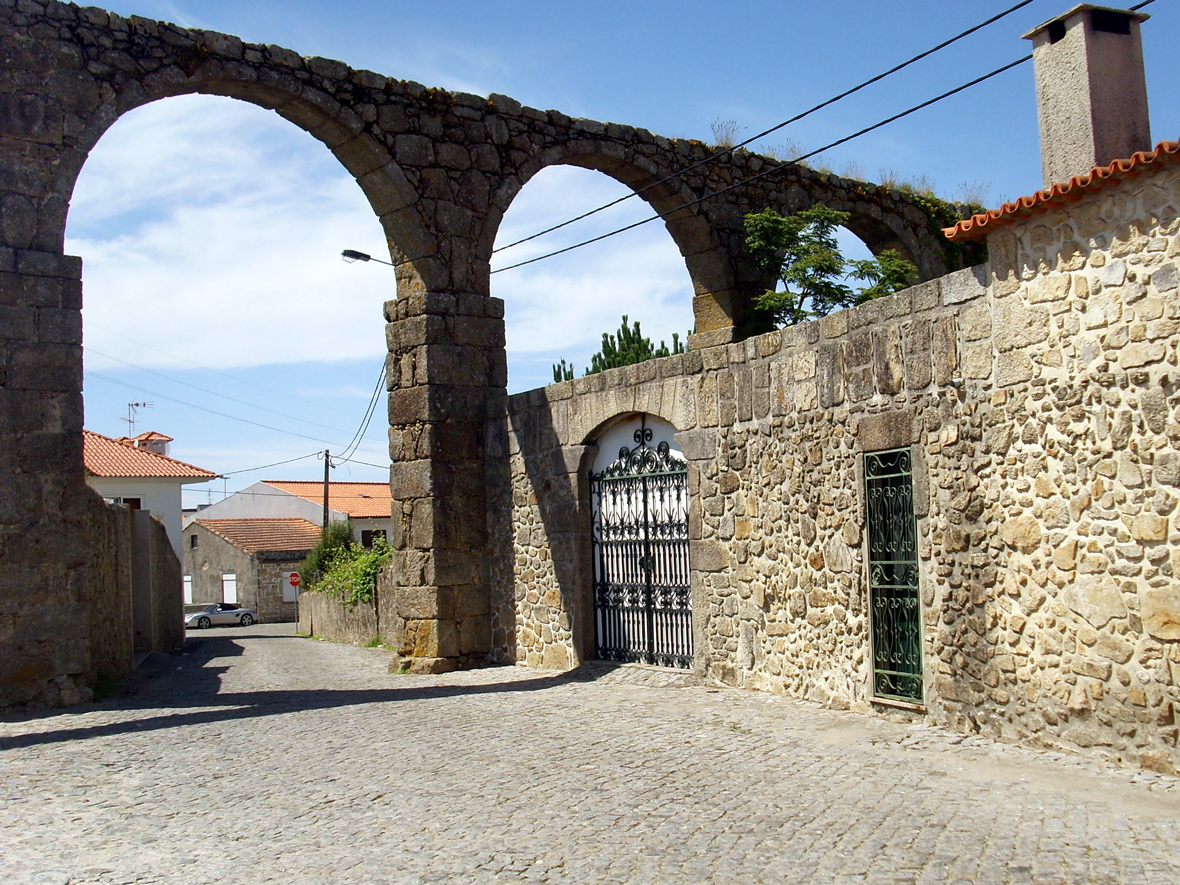
The Santa Clara Aqueduct crosses the entire parish.

Argivai is an urban area in Póvoa de Varzim, Portugal. It is an ancient ecclesiastical parish and former civil parish located in the city of Póvoa de Varzim. In the census of 2001, it had a population of 2,187 inhabitants and a total area of 2.32 km^{2}. A 2012 law merged the parish with neighbouring Póvoa de Varzim (parish) and Beiriz, becoming the southern parish of the city of Póvoa de Varzim, with a population of 34,266 inhabitants and a total area of 11.88 km^{2}.

The name of the parish is of Germanic origin, from Argivadi; despite that, it is popularly known as Anjo (angel).

== History ==
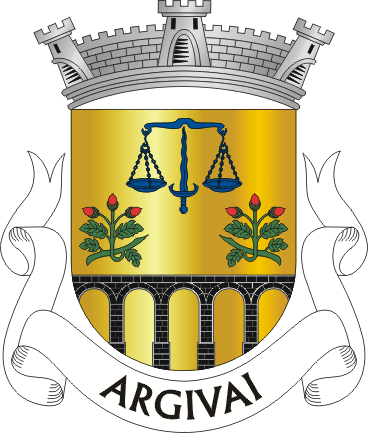
Former shield used during some periods while it was a civil parish.

The parish of Argivai is, like many parishes of Póvoa de Varzim, very ancient and its founding date is not known. It is known that it already existed in the 11th century. In its territory, a pre-Roman Castro settlement known by the default name of Castro de Argivai. This settlement was probably a Castro Culture farmhouse, as the main settlement per se was located in Cividade de Terroso.

In the modern period, it was an ecclesiastical parish in the county of Barcelos. Póvoa de Varzim itself, then Varazim, was a place in this ecclesiastical parish. And the first seat of the church of Argivai was located in Varzinha, which Pinho Leal argues is the modern Póvoa de Varzim. During the Middle Ages, Varzim was a fief with a large territory, including Argivai, extending from the coast to the hills and the Este river, with the municipality of Póvoa de Varzim being established in 1308. The lands outside the township were incorporated into the Lands of Faria, later incorporated into the county of Barcelos.

With the urban enlargement of Póvoa de Varzim and the town's growth (disputing it with Barcelos), Argivai was reduced in size in 1707. Its remaining territory was finally incorporated into the municipality of Póvoa de Varzim in 1836, as the civil parish of Argivai. The civil parish was extinct and incorporated into the parish of Póvoa de Varzim in 1842, but it was recovered by 1853. In 2012, it merged again with the central parish and Beiriz to create a larger parish, Póvoa de Varzim, Beiriz e Argivai.

== Geography ==
The parish of Argivai is today very small and enclosed between the parishes of Póvoa de Varzim and the parish of Vila do Conde. It is crossed by the Santa Clara Aqueduct, giving it a very pleasing outlook. The urban and transportation development destroyed much of its beautiful natural areas, including the traditional picnic areas that the Poveiros loved to go to on Easter Monday, which led the population to choose other locations on Anjo festival. A festival that even holds the name of the place.

=== City districts ===
The parish of Argivai contains two of the eleven city districts:

- Argivai
- Gândara (eastern part)

The parish was traditionally divided into twelve hamlets: Aguieira, Bom Sucesso, Calves, Casal do Monte, Cassapos, Gandra, Igreja, Fiéis de Deus, Oliveira, Padrão, Pedreira, and Quintela.
