= Balazar =

- Civil parish
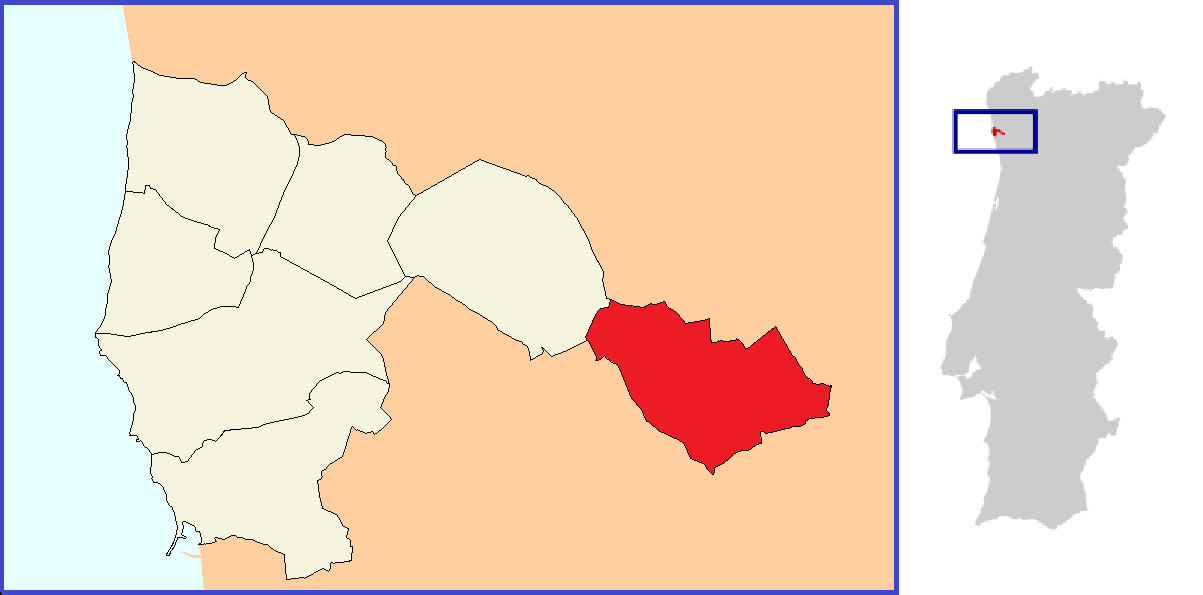
- Coordinates: 41.408°N 8.626°W
- Country: Portugal
- Region: Norte
- Metropolitan area: Porto
- District: Porto
- Municipality: Póvoa de Varzim

Area
  - Total: 11.61 km^{2} (4.48 sq mi)

Population (2011)
  - Total: 2,543
  - Density: 220/km^{2} (570/sq mi)
- Time zone: UTC+00:00 (WET)
  - Summer (DST): UTC+01:00 (WEST)
- Postal code: 4570 Balazar PVZ
- Patron: Saint Eulalia of Mérida and Blessed Alexandrina
- Website: jfbalasar.pt

Balazar (or Balasar) is one of the seven parishes of the municipality of Póvoa de Varzim. The population in 2011 was 2,543, in an area of 11.61 km².

Each year thousands of pilgrims and many other tourists visit the Sanctuary of Blessed Alexandrina of Balazar.

== History ==
It was an ecclesiastical parish in Barcelos until 1836, when it became a civil unit and transferred to Póvoa de Varzim. In 1853 it was transferred to Vila Nova de Famalicão, but Póvoa de Varzim town hall requested its return and it was transferred back to Póvoa two years later.

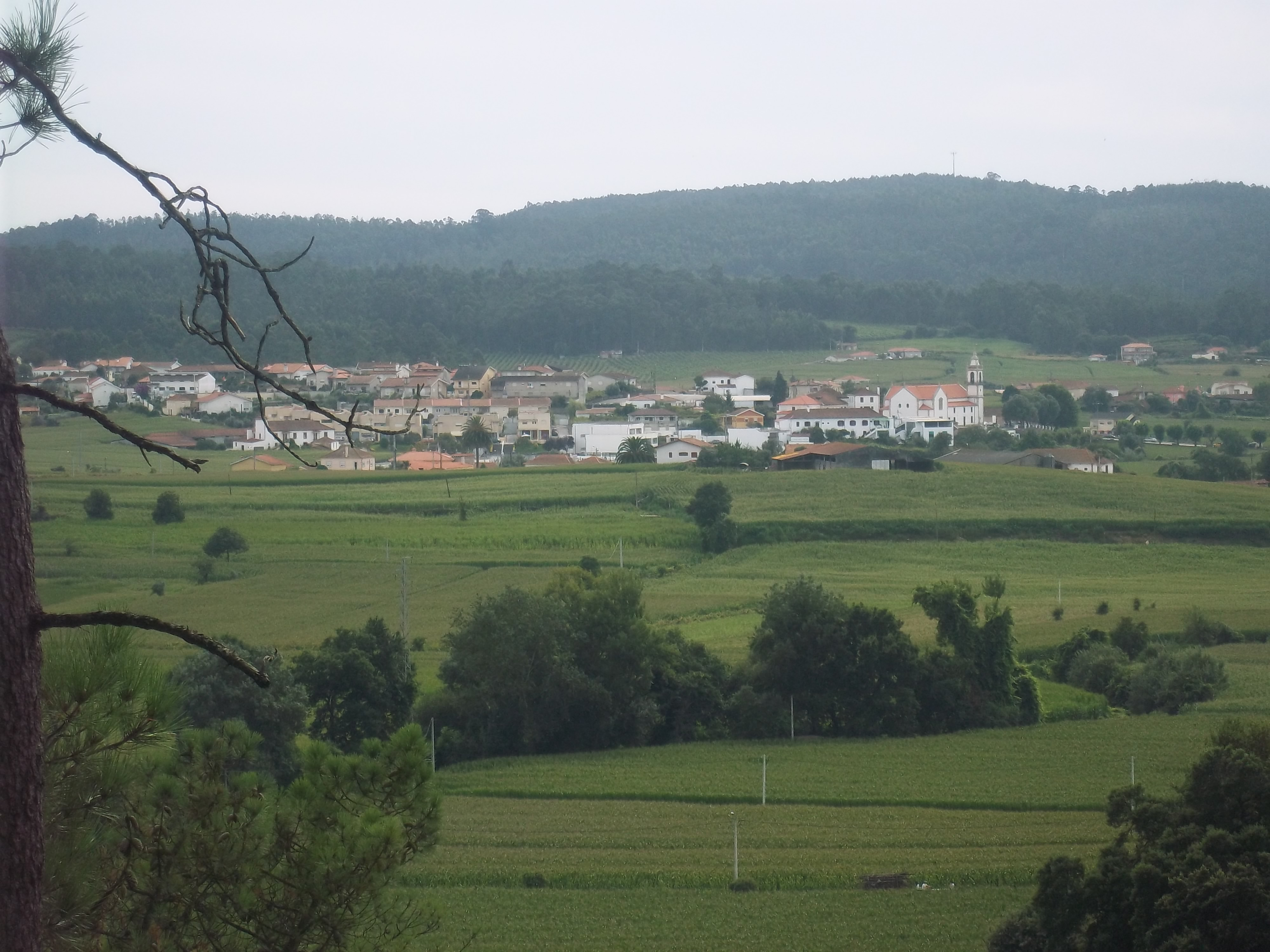
Panoramic view of Balazar.

The parish became famous in 2004, after the beatification of Alexandrina Maria da Costa by Pope John Paul II, on April 25 of that year. Pilgrimages to the parish church where Alexandrina's body rests were already common, and became more popular. The church is contemplating whether to make a shrine to Alexandrina, depending on the number of pilgrims and if she is declared a saint.

== Geography ==
Balazar is located 14 km east of downtown Póvoa de Varzim; and borders Rates to the west and the municipalities of Barcelos, Vila Nova de Famalicão, and Vila do Conde.

=== Localities ===
The parish has several localities (lugares or localidades): Agrelos, Além, Bouça Velha, Calvário, Caminho Largo, Casal, Covilhã, Cruz, Escariz, Fontaínhas, Gandra, Gestrins, Gresufes, Guardinhos, Lousadelo, Matinho, Monte Tapado, Outeiro, Quinta, Telo, Terra Ruim, Vela, and Vila Pouca.

== Sport ==
Associação e Desportiva Cultural Balasar is a football club that plays its home matches at the Lino Araújo sports complex. The complex was opened in 2019.

== See also ==
- First Thursdays Devotion
- List of Christian pilgrimage sites
