= Póvoa de Varzim Holiday =

Annual observance in Portugal, 29 June

Saint Peter Festival Festas de São Pedro
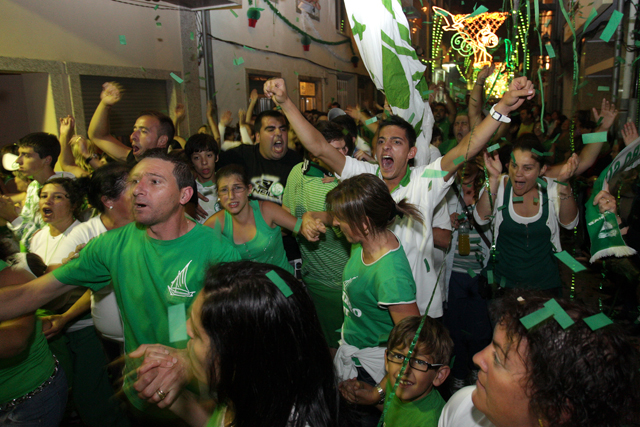
- Saint Peter Festival in Bairro Sul supporting their Rusga
- Also called: Municipal Holiday of Póvoa de Varzim, Feriado Municipal da Póvoa de Varzim
- Observed by: Póvoa de Varzim; Caxinas and Poça da Barca (Vila do Conde); Povoans; Other Portuguese as part of Santos Populares celebrations
- Type: Ethnographic, midsummer
- Celebrations: Parades (Rusgas), competitions, bonfires, fireworks, feasting, drinking, raves, procession, decorations, national dress, sports, military parade
- Date: June 29
- Next time: 29 June 2027
- Duration: 2 days
- Frequency: annual

Póvoa de Varzim Holiday, Saint Peter Festivals (Festas de São Pedro) or Saint Peter Night (Noite de São Pedro) is celebrated annually on June 29, Saint Peter's Day in Póvoa de Varzim, Portugal. It is a late midsummer festival and the last of the three Portuguese popular saints — Santos Populares. It is celebrated with the lighting of bonfires, dances, competitions between quarters and diverse parties. Saint Peter festival includes the "rusgas", in which inhabitants of one quarter (bairro) visit in a parade other quarters in the evening of June 28. Women are dressed as tricana poveira (women dressed in a traditional costume with a sensual walking style). Each neighborhood has its own festival, neighborhood colors and altar to Saint Peter.

Traditionally, people often eat grilled sardines with bread, caldo verde, and wine in the streets, with a bonfire nearby where people gather to celebrate. In the 21st century, younger population, although participating strongly in this festival, adopted new ways to celebrate it, such as the very popular Saint Peter raves in the waterfront, in Carvalhido and in Largo Caetano de Oliveira.

== History ==
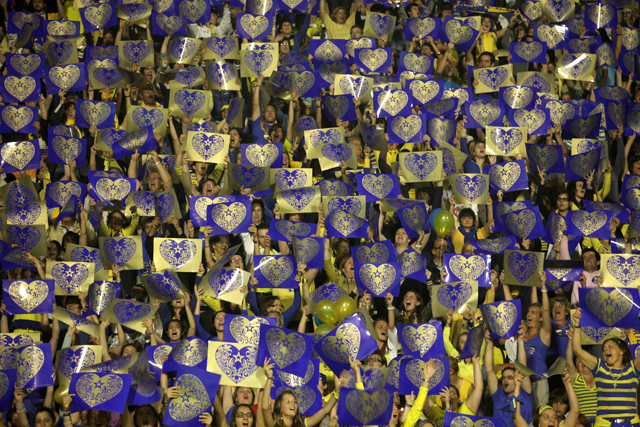
Supporters of Bairro Norte during the Rusgas competition in Varzim stadium.

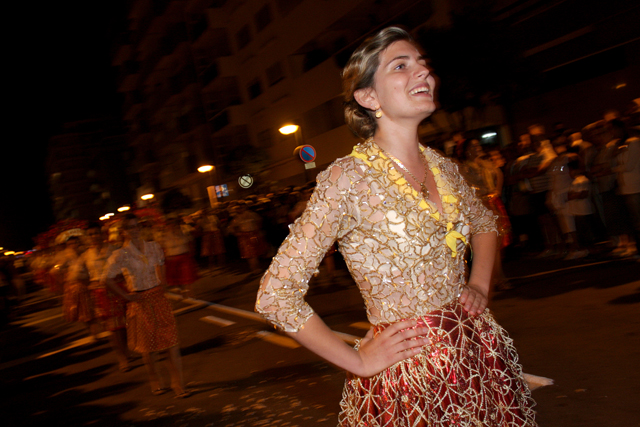
Tricana girl in a Rusga parade.

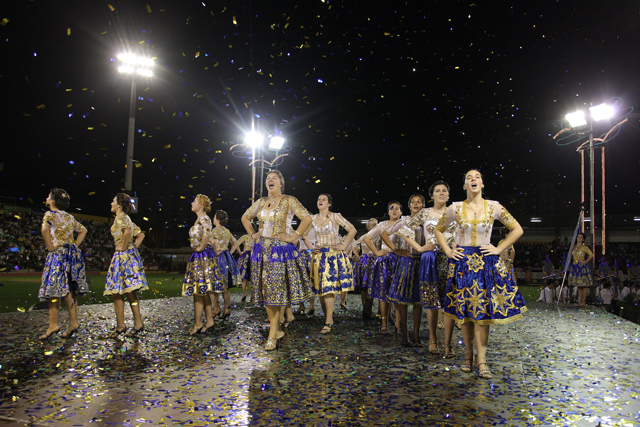
Bairro Norte Tricana girls in the Rusgas competition in Varzim Stadium.

Saint Peter Festival was most popular before the 1892 shipwreck. The shipwreck had a significant impact in the community and the use of the Branqueta traditional garments was also affected, as the Branqueta was associated with festivities. The community saw no reasons for further celebrations. Before 1962, Saint Peter Festival was a minor festival, major midsummer celebrations occurred during St. John's day. The local municipal holiday was celebrated on August 15, the Feast of the Assumption, the patron saint of Povoan Fishermen, but the local holiday became a national one.

The town hall decided to change the local holiday. Two options were presented: Saint Peter Festival, honouring the fishermen's saint, given the fact Póvoa was a traditional fisher town and Anjo Festival, an Easter Monday celebration, a remnant of Pagan festivities and quite popular amongst the population. Due to the fact that Easter Monday was already observed as a national holiday in Portugal in the 1960s, the generalized view was that Saint Peter Festival should be the local holiday and that was confirmed by pools in local newspapers at the time.

All the traditional midsummer elements were kept, such as the bonfire, the celebrations occur in the streets and competition between quarters started to occur, this was important as there was a traditional rivalry which started in the 19th century between Bairro Norte and Bairro Sul, two distinct fishermen quarters. And the rivalry between these quarters fueled the competition between different parts of the city, which organized themselves into distinct associations.

In 2014, with the holiday falling on Saturday, the city received over half-million visitors in a single night, as Saint Peter Festival marks the end of the Santos Populares celebrations in Portugal. In 2015, it was transmitted live nationwide for the first time, by Porto Canal. In 2016, the channel kept broadcasting the event. The main Portuguese public broadcaster, RTP 1 did the same in 2016 and 2017 as part of a full coverage of the popular saints festivals in Portugal, following similar broadcasts in Lisbon (Saint Anthony) and Porto (Saint John's).

== Saint Peter night ==
Saint Peter night occurs in the evening of June 28th to extends to the early morning of the 29th. Major celebrations take place in each district main street, the city center and in the seafront.

Saint Peter Night

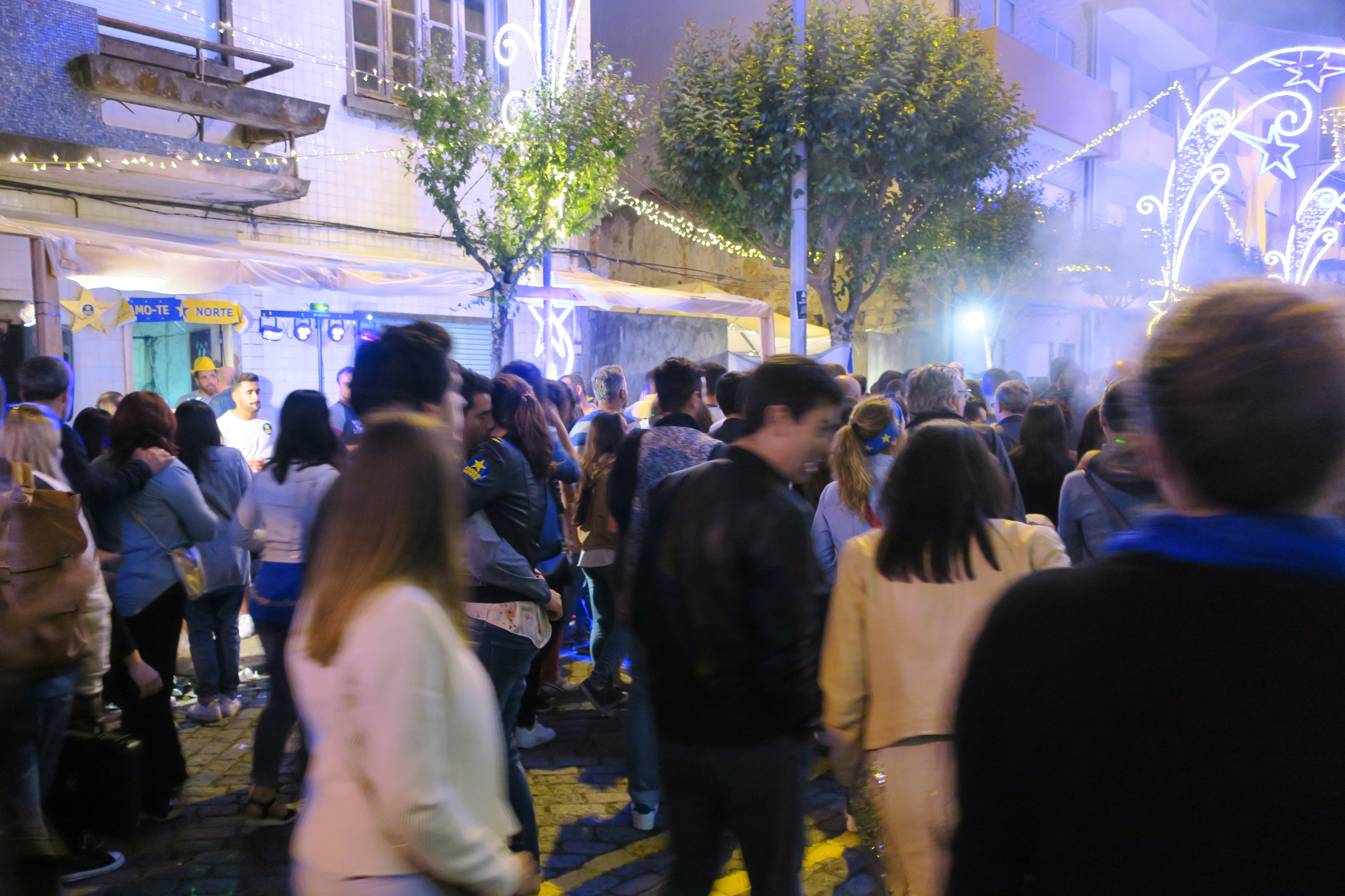
In Bairro Norte main street: the festival occurs in the street, but enters into the garages of houses and bars along the street.

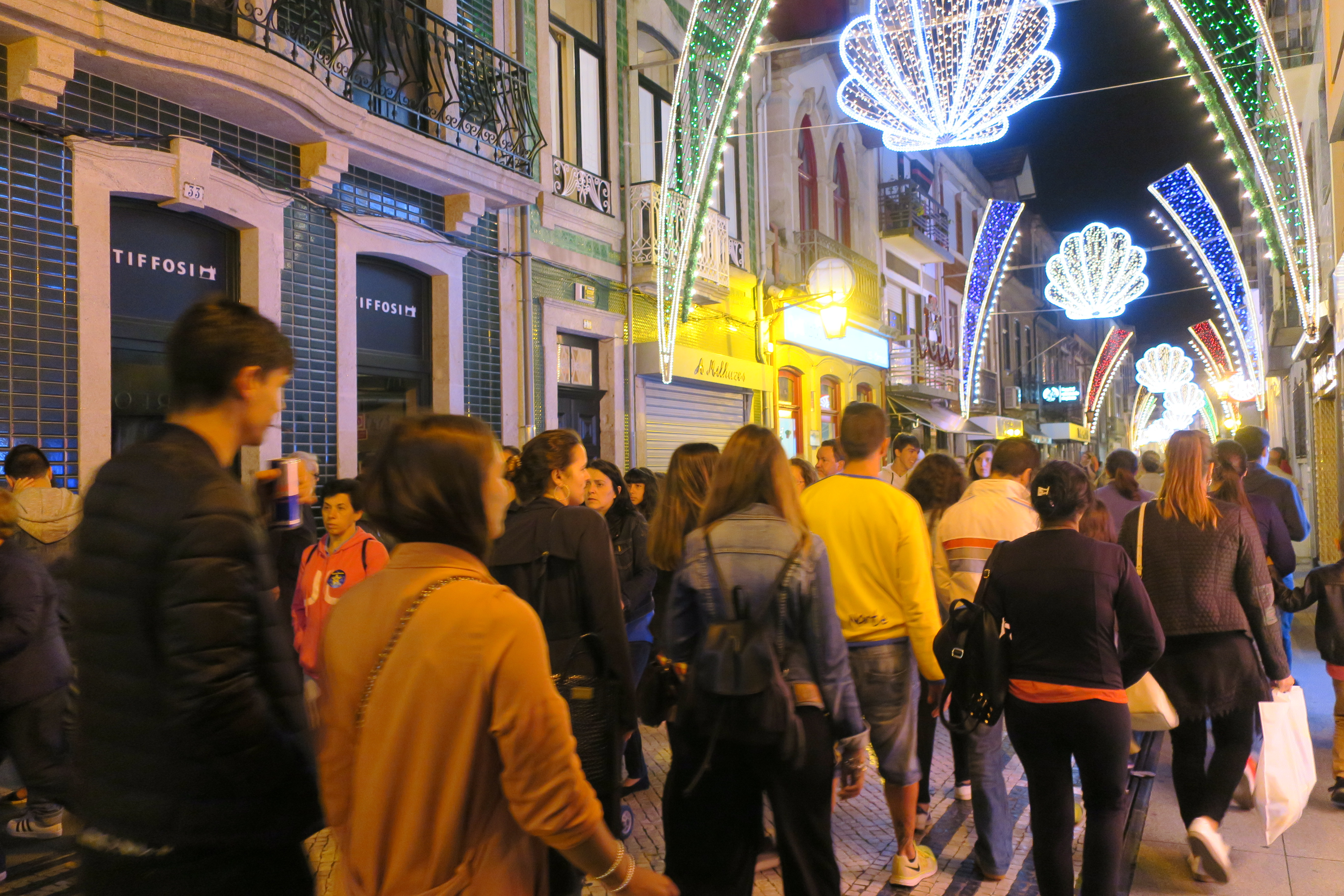
People moving between different sites where the festival hotspots are taking place

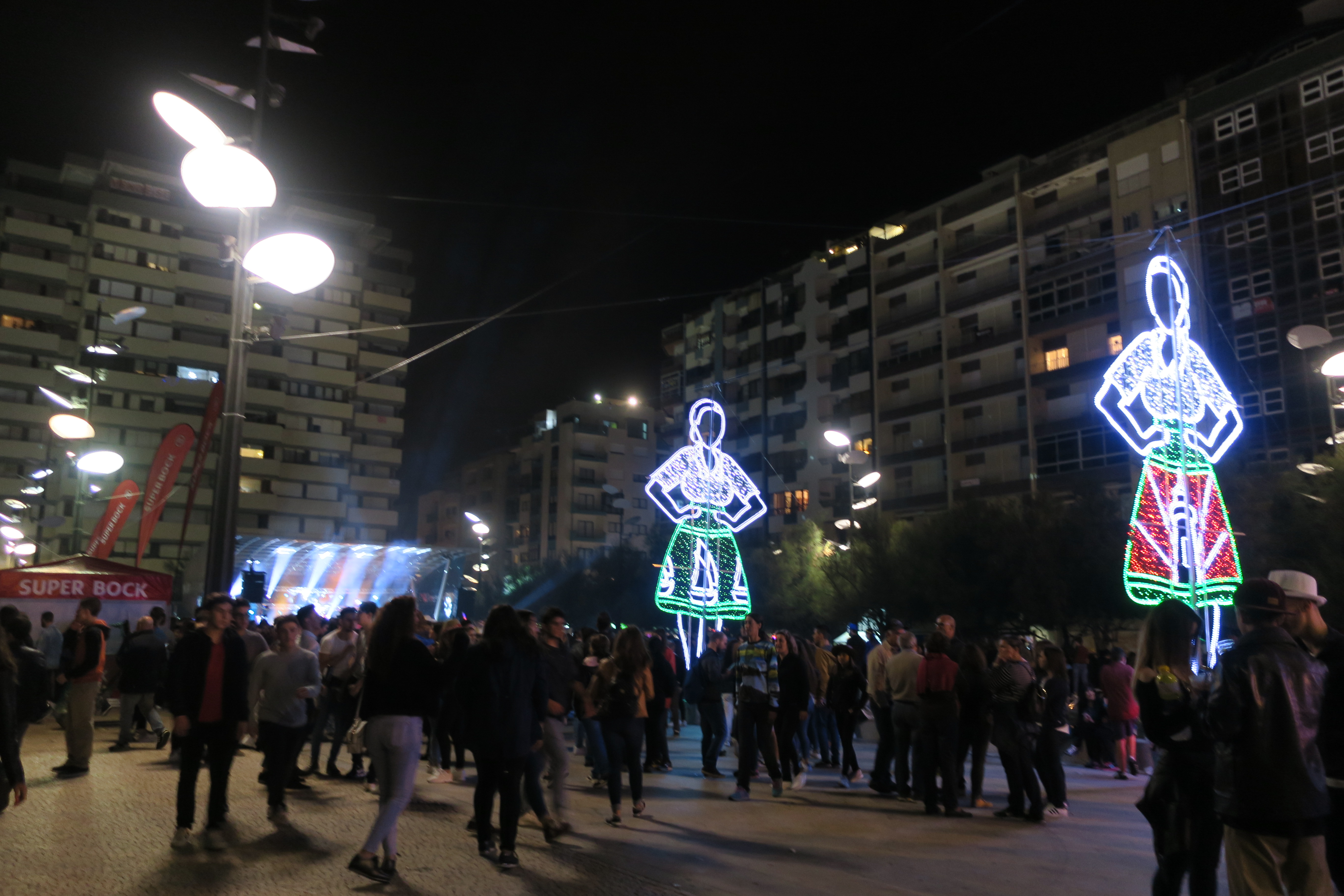
Live concert in Passeio Alegre square.

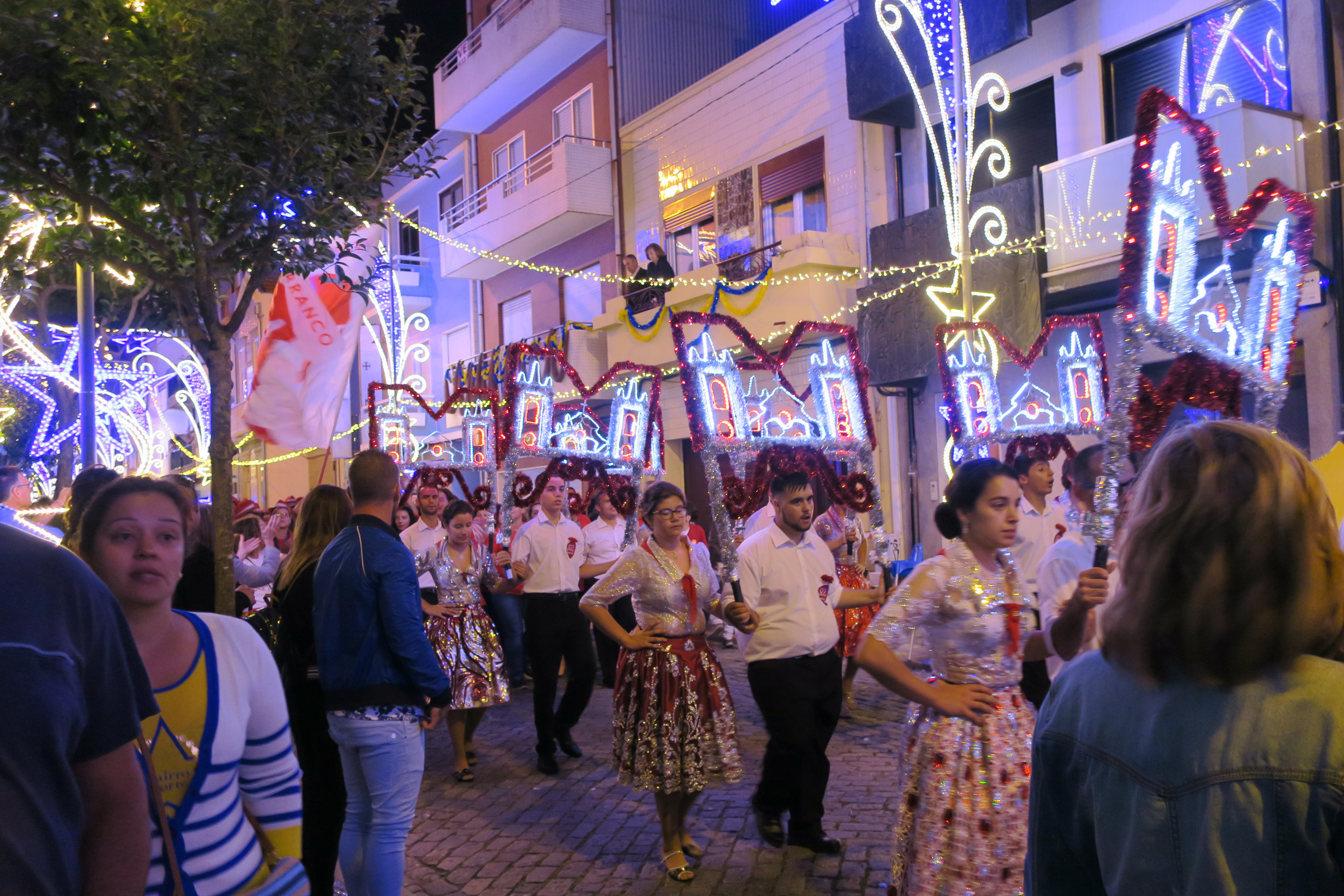
A Bairro da Matriz rusga in Bairro Norte. A parade of each district visits other district's main streets.

== Competing quarters ==
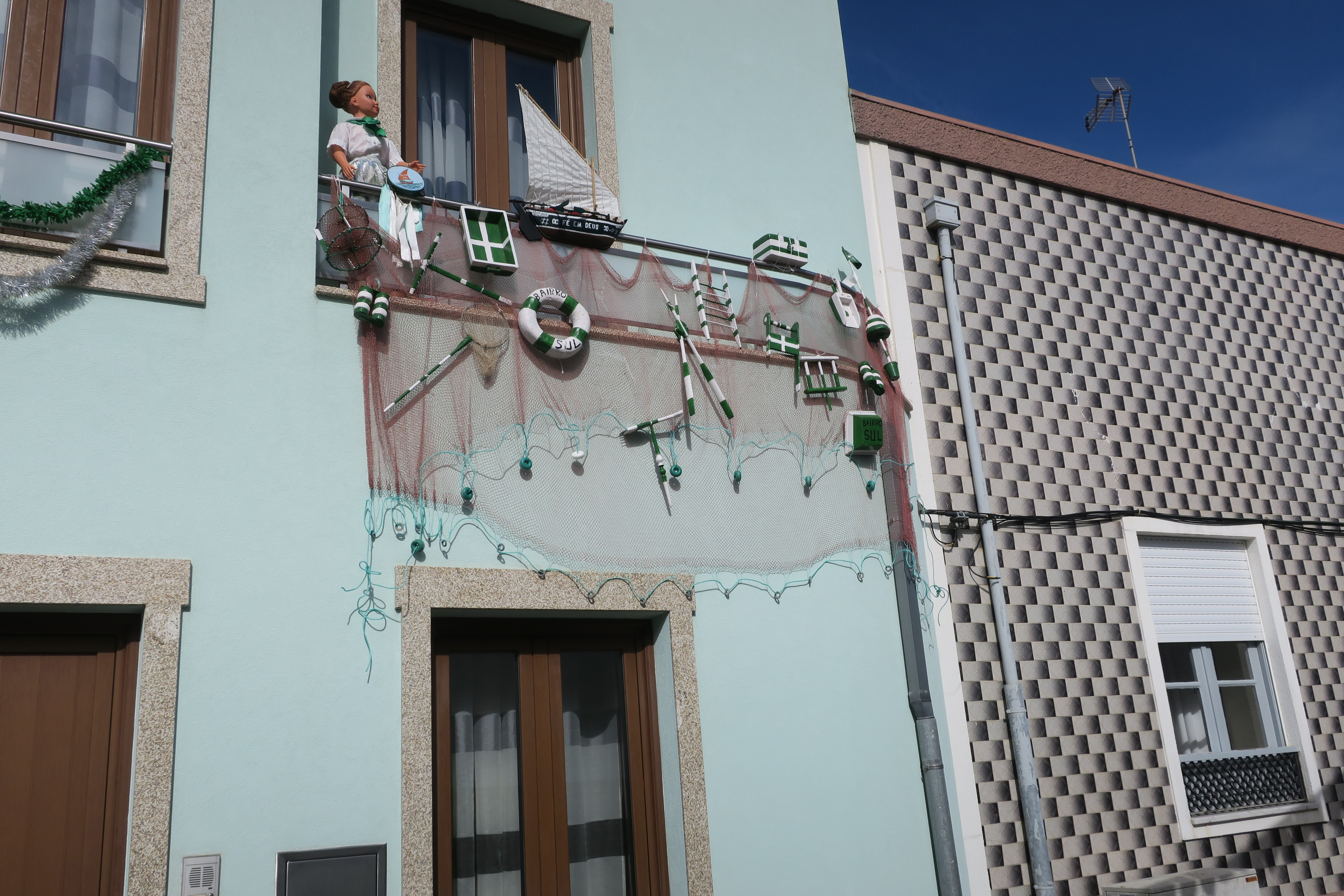
Bairro Sul typical decoration: Fishing tackle and a doll representing a tricana.

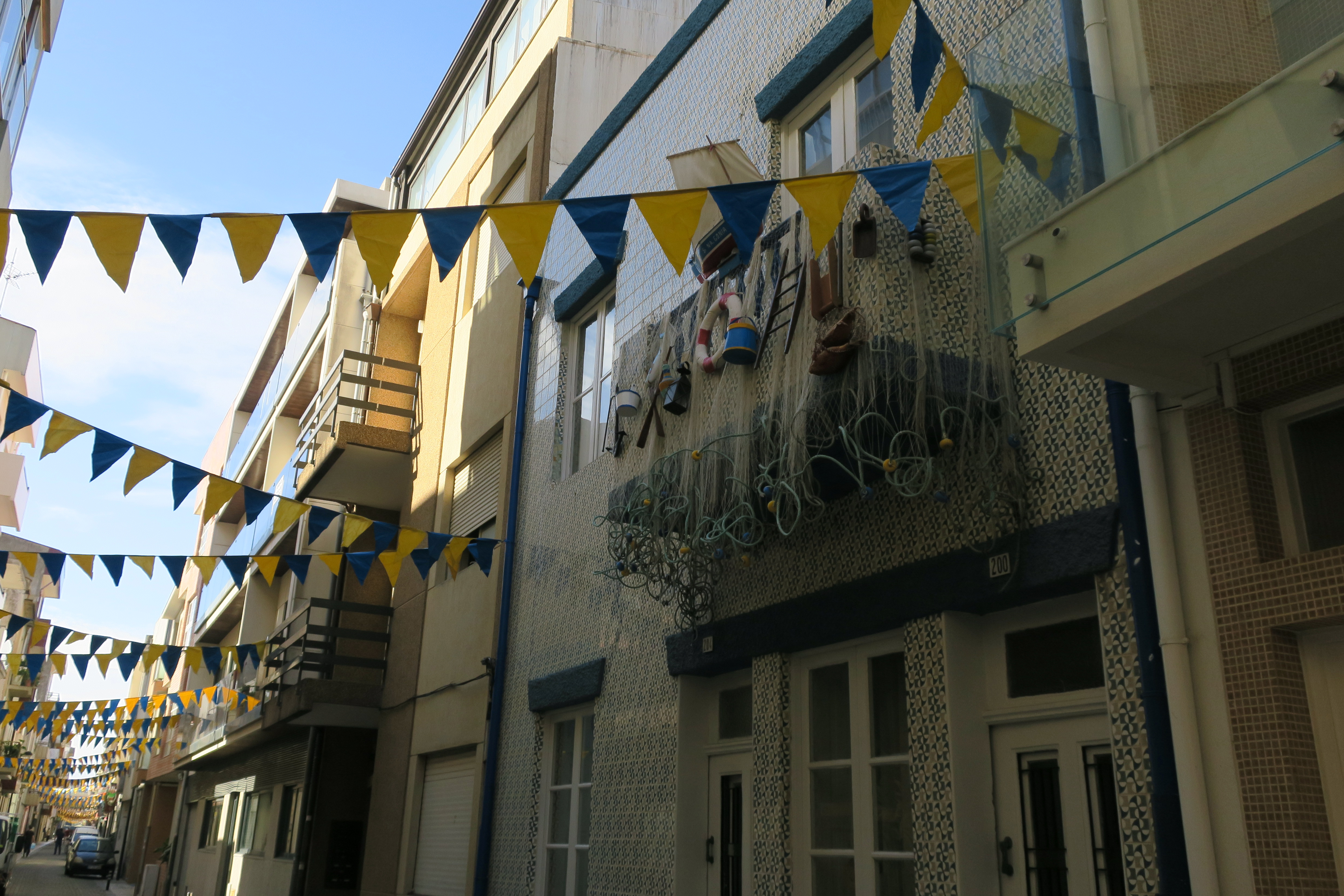
Bairro Norte house decorations with fishing tackle decoration.

The colors of the competing traditional quarters are often taken from a brotherhood which predated the establishment of the quarter associations: Bairro Sul's colors are taken from the Royal Brotherhood of Nossa Senhora da Assunção, established in 1761. Rival Bairro Norte colors are taken from S. José de Ribamar Brotherhood established in 1859.

Quarter (Bairro)	color code
Bairro Norte	Blue and yellow
Bairro Sul	Green and white
Bairro da Matriz	Red and white
Bairro da Mariadeira	Red and yellow
Bairro de Belém	Blue and white
Bairro de Regufe	Red and green

== Rusgas ==
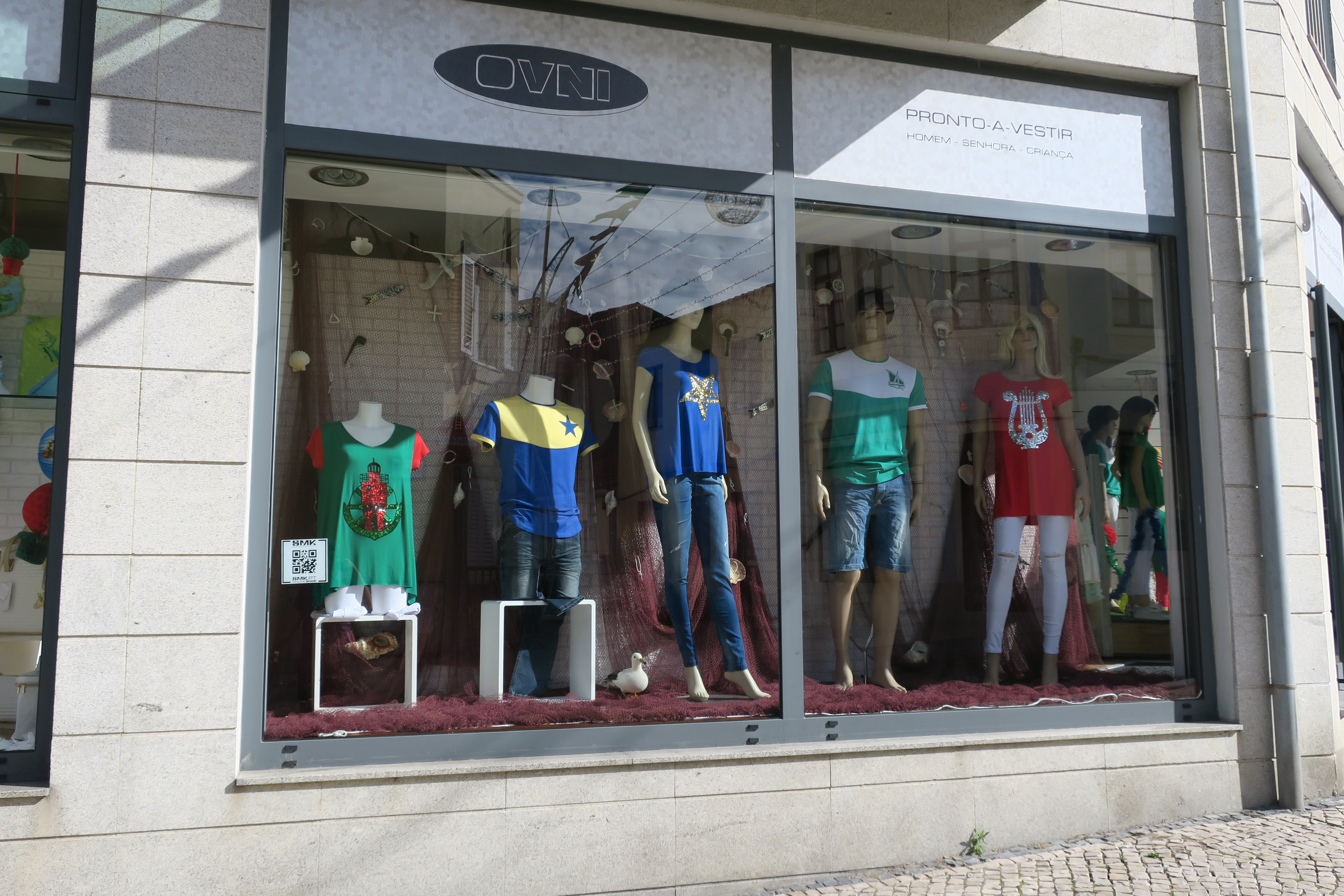
A store selling items for everyday use during the festivities.

There are three occasions in which the Rusgas (people's parades around the streets) with pairs of men and women (in tricana poveira traditional clothing) appear, usually followed by supporting people from their quarter.

- During the Saint Peter's night (Noitada de São Pedro), in the evening of June 28, by visiting rival quarters and their own quarter. In each quarter a Saint Peter Festival is being held, with music, dances, grilled sardines and wine.
- In the evening of June 29, in Varzim Stadium, competing with other quarters. Due to rivalry, no winner is declared and, instead, a Póvoa joint rusga is formed at the end.
- In Desfile Nocturno das Rusgas (Rusgas Night Parade), with a variable date, ending the popular festivities, in which all rusgas present themselves to the population in Avenida dos Banhos (Bairro Norte waterfront) and Avenida dos Descobrimentos (Bairro Sul waterfront).

== Altars and preparations ==
=== Procession ===
A great procession is held on June 29, between Matriz Church of Póvoa de Varzim and Lapa Church. The procession includes all three popular saints celebrated throughout Portugal in June: Saint Anthony, Saint John and Saint Peter. The procession includes not only religious themes, but also has ethnographic concerns, such as the Branqueta traditional clothing, tricana and important associations which are presented in the procession.
