= Póvoa de Varzim Parish =

Former civil parish in Póvoa de Varzim, Portugal

Coordinates: 41.383°N 8.763°W

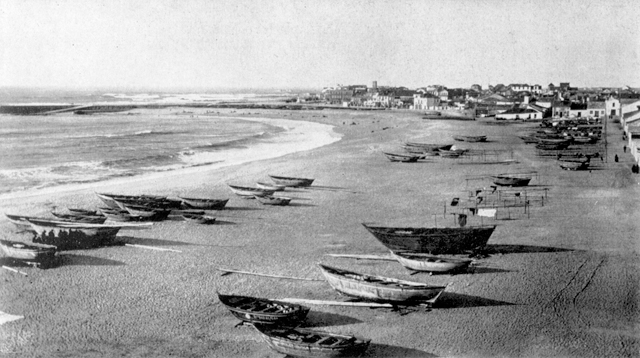
Póvoa Bay in the early 20th century.

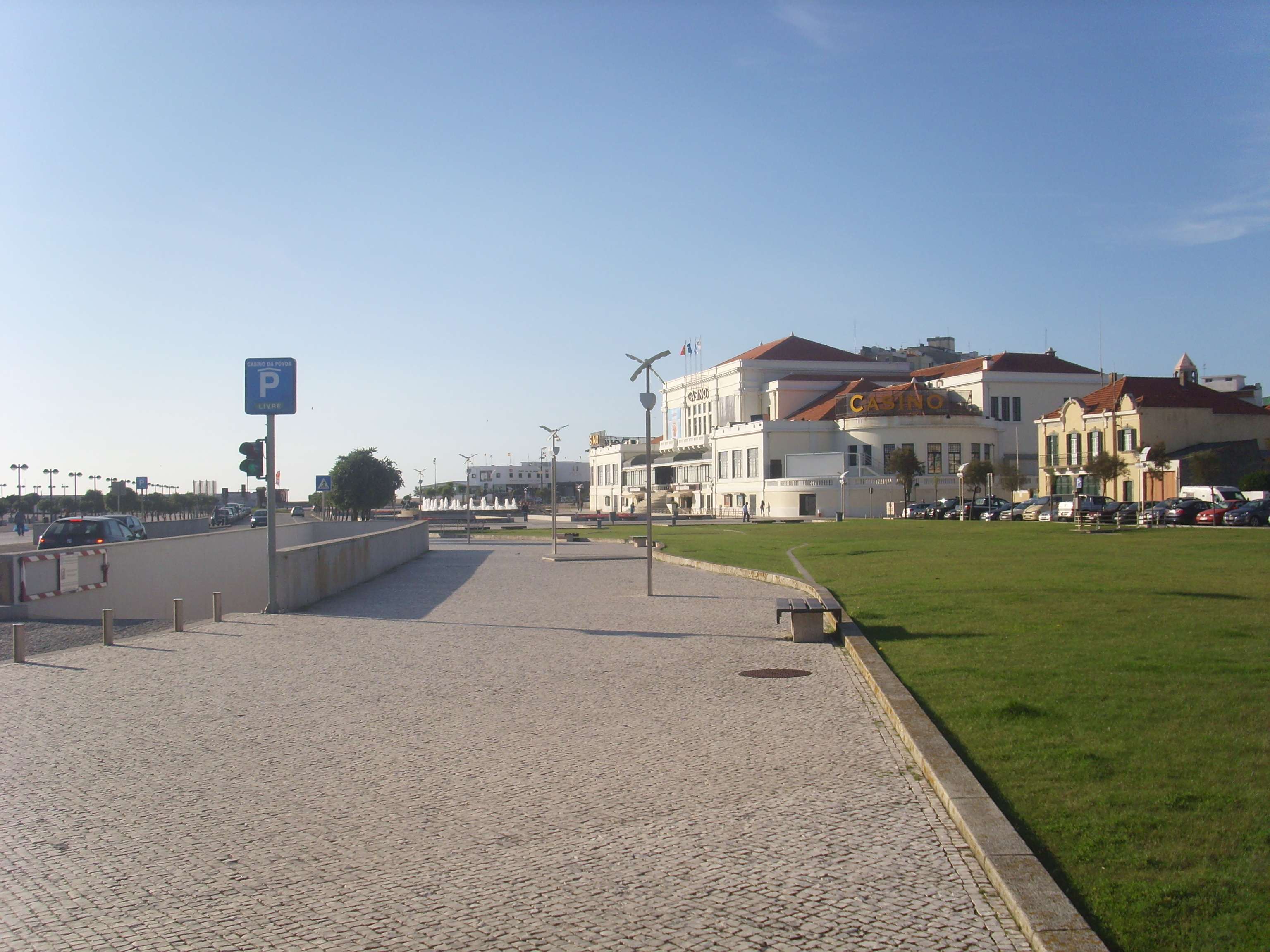
Largo do Casino (Casino Square).

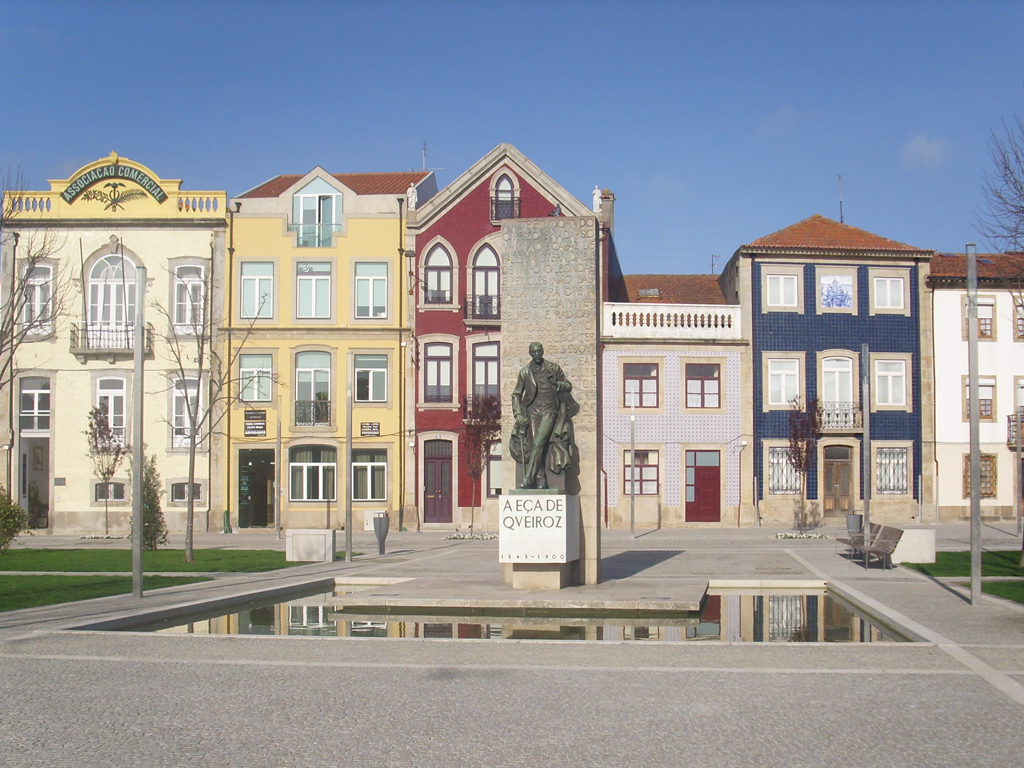
Praça do Almada.

Póvoa de Varzim is a Portuguese former civil parish, located in the city of Póvoa de Varzim. It is the core of the city of Póvoa de Varzim and until the new city limits established in 1995 it was the single parish that made up the city. In the census of 2011, it had a population of 28,420 inhabitants and a total area of 5.25 km^{2}. A 2012 law merged the parish with neighbouring Argivai and Beiriz, becoming the southern parish of the city of Póvoa de Varzim, known as União das Freguesias da Póvoa de Varzim, Beiriz e Argivai.

Póvoa de Varzim is densely populated. The medieval town of Varzim was a knights honour and the Port of Varzim was disputed between the local lordship and the early Portuguese kings.

Religiously speaking, there is no Póvoa de Varzim parish; it was divided into three parishes in 1935, parochial identity of its main quarters (Bairro Norte, Bairro Sul and Bairro da Matriz) predate this event. Póvoa de Varzim ecclesiastical parish (Santa Maria de Varzim Parish) existed only between 1456 and 1935. Prior to that, and despite the existence of a chapel, it was part of a larger Argivai parish, that still exists as a separate although diminished parish in the city.

== Geography ==
The area of the parish of Póvoa de Varzim is today practically totally urbanized and completely transformed by man. The former Póvoa Bay (Enseada da Póvoa), is the modern Port of Póvoa de Varzim, former small rivers existed in the city, as some excavations near the Casino suggest. Praça do Almada, the civic center square, was the location of the Boído Lagoon in Póvoa Bay. In the Northern high-rise district, another lagoon existed until the 20th century.

Historically, the city was formed by three urban quarters: Bairro da Matriz (14th century), Bairro Sul (17th century) and Bairro Norte (19th century), these are still the most important and the most beloved neighbourhoods by the population, as living in their area is not a requirement to one being considered part of it. Over time, other neighbourhoods started to be created. These and others areas had been inhabited from much earlier.

Its Atlantic waters were very popular for thalassotherapy until the mid-20th century, due to large amounts of algae and iodine.

=== City districts ===
The parish of Póvoa de Varzim contains nine of the eleven city districts:

- Agro-Velho (south part)
- Bairro Norte
- Centro
- Bairro Sul
- Parque da Cidade (a very small part of it, known as Montgeron after the sister French town)
- Barreiros
- Giesteira (part)
- Gândara (west part)
- Bairro da Matriz/Bairro da Mariadeira

=== Penalves ===
Penalves is a neighbourhood of the city of Póvoa de Varzim. Penalves was formerly known as Penalva or before it as Penalva de Regufe. Penalva is of Celtic roots: pen from penha (stone) with alva (white), thus white stone. In the 17th century, the Penalves variant became common. Penalves is located in the south part of Matriz/Mariadeira district.

== See also ==
- History of Póvoa de Varzim
