= Tricana poveira =

Traditional dress of Póvoa de Varzim

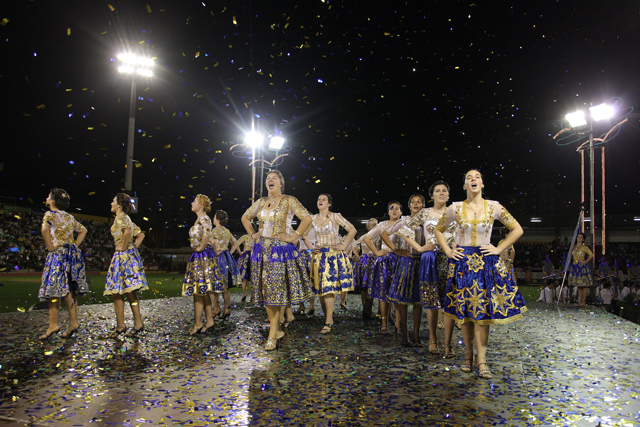
Tricana girls during Saint Peter Festival

Tricana poveira is a traditional style of women's clothing from the Portuguese city of Póvoa de Varzim. This look, consisting of colorful costumes, was fashionable and mainstream from the 1920s to the 1960s. Women who dressed in the Tricana poveira style became known as tricana girls.

== Description ==
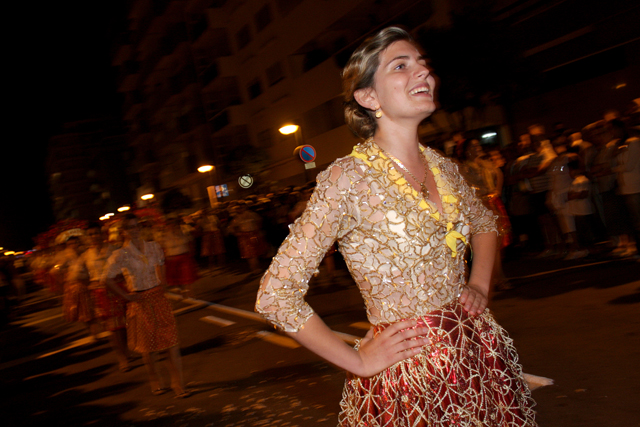
Bairro da Mariadeira tricana girl

During tricana's heyday, a tricana girl would typically wear a shawl, an apron, a skirt, a handkerchief and glossy high-heeled slippers.

They were thought of as Povoan beauty icons. The author José de Azevedo, referring to their peculiar way of walking and dressing, called tricanas common people with the mannerisms of royalty.

Even though the fashion was based on traditional fishers' clothing, the Tricanas were generally from a blue collar background, often daughters of shoemakers, carpenters or similar craftsmen, while many worked as tailors themselves. They applied their knowledge derived from their background in fashion-related industries to their own dressing style. Bairro da Matriz quarter was famed for its charming and attractive tricanas.

Meanwhile, women actually working in the fishing industry would wear their traditional costumes. Though dressed similarly to the tricana girls, they were visibly poorer and wore longer skirts made of lower-quality materials and in darker colors.

Hair texturing techniques are also relevant to the style and follows traditional Povoan techniques, most notably the pulling of the hair called puxo.

=== Color code ===
During parades, tricanas from the six traditional quarters wear dresses in their neighborhood colors.

Quarter (Bairro)	Tricana dressing color code
Bairro Norte	Blue and yellow
Bairro Sul	Green and white
Bairro da Matriz	Red and white
Bairro da Mariadeira	Red and yellow
Bairro de Belém	Blue and white
Bairro de Regufe	Red and green

Tricanas poveiras

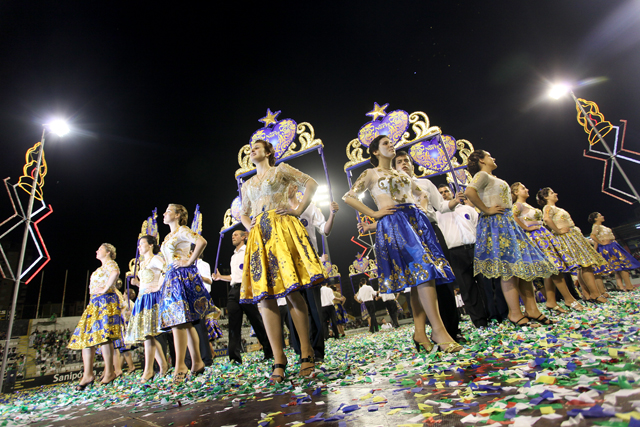
Tricanas using Bairro Norte's colors and the North star, symbols of the quarter

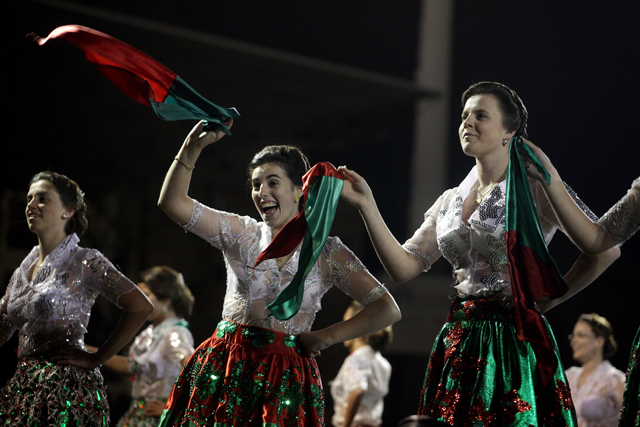
Tricanas using Bairro de Regufe's red and green

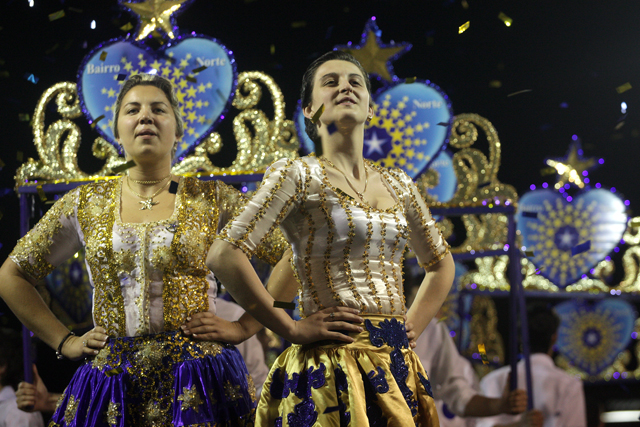
Bairro Norte girls during a folk festival

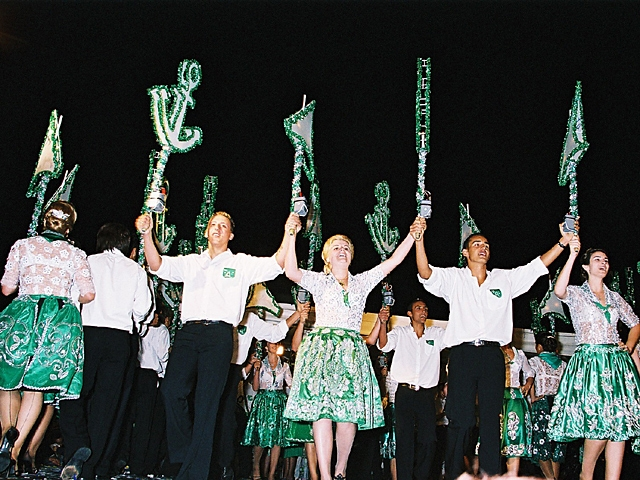
Bairro Sul Tricana girls

== History ==
The tricana style's heyday was between the 1920s and the 1960s, when it had a strong impact both within Póvoa de Varzim and on outsiders visiting the city.

Tricana costumes were mainstream fashion amongst middle class teenagers until the appearance of ready-to-wear clothing in the 1970s. As younger people adopted more modern international fashions, tricana poveira now only appears in urban folklore groups and parades.

Nowadays, tricana costumes can be quite expensive depending on the preferences of the tricana girl and the materials used. Still kept as a strong tradition, tricana girls during Rusgas de São Pedro (Saint Peter Parades), play a big part in the city's festivities on June 28 and 29.

Tricanas do Cidral (from Bairro da Matriz quarter), the first folklore group based on the tricana style, appeared as early as 1920. Tricanas da Lapa (from Bairro Sul quarter) banded together in 1952, Rancho Estrela do Norte in 1954 and the regional Tricanas Poveiras in 1993. Leões da Lapa F.C., the city's south quarter association, has a Miss Tricana contest.
