= Póvoa de Varzim, Beiriz e Argivai =

- Civil parish
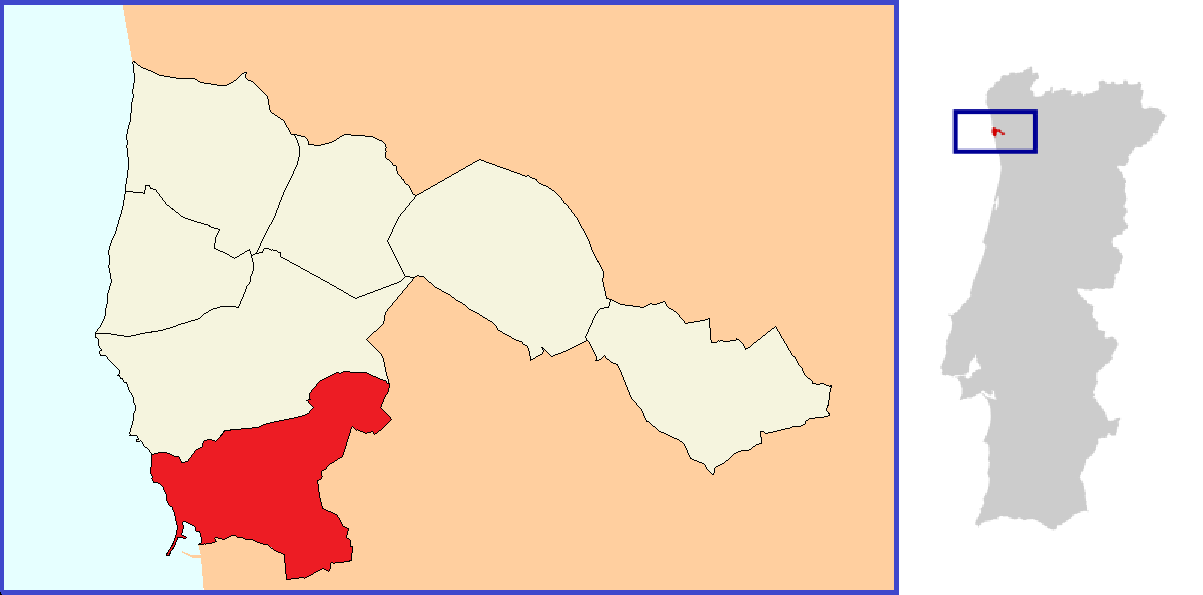
- Coordinates: 41.38°N 8.76°W
- Country: Portugal
- Region: Norte
- Metropolitan area: Porto
- District: Porto
- Municipality: Póvoa de Varzim

Area
  - Total: 12.60 km^{2} (4.86 sq mi)

Population (2011)
  - Total: 34,266
  - Density: 2,700/km^{2} (7,000/sq mi)
- Time zone: UTC+00:00 (WET)
  - Summer (DST): UTC+01:00 (WEST)

União das Freguesias da Póvoa de Varzim, Beiriz e Argivai is a major part of the Portuguese city of Póvoa de Varzim and the city's south side region. It is one of the seven civil parishes of Póvoa de Varzim. It is, by far, the most populated with 34,266 inhabitants (2011 census), more than half of the total population in the municipality. The administrative parish evolved from the amalgamation of the former parishes Póvoa de Varzim, Beiriz and Argivai. The population in 2011 was 34,266, in an area of 12.60 km^{2}.

The south side of the city of Póvoa de Varzim has varied topologies and demographic measures. It includes areas such as fishermen's Bairro Sul, Bairro Norte's beachfront highrises, Póvoa de Varzim's Ancient Roman and Medieval quarters around Bairro da Matriz, Largo das Dores, and Rua da Junqueira, the ancient parish of Argivai and Suburban Beiriz, with countryside estates and newer middle and upper-class residential areas.

Póvoa de Varzim, Beiriz e Argivai boasts an array of cultural and social offerings. The south side is serviced by Metro do Porto light rail and bus services. It is serviced by the A28 and A7 motorways, national and municipal highways.

== History ==
The civil parish was established in 2013 under the national administrative reform. It is as an amalgamation of three former civil parishes established in 1836 and contains five ecclesiastical parishes: Argivai, Bairro Norte, Bairro Sul, Bairro da Matriz, and Beiriz. Argivai and Beiriz are ancient parishes with known records dating to the 11th century and the remaining were established in 1935, by splitting the Póvoa de Varzim parish, created around 1456.
