= Praça do Almada =

Civic center of Póvoa de Varzim

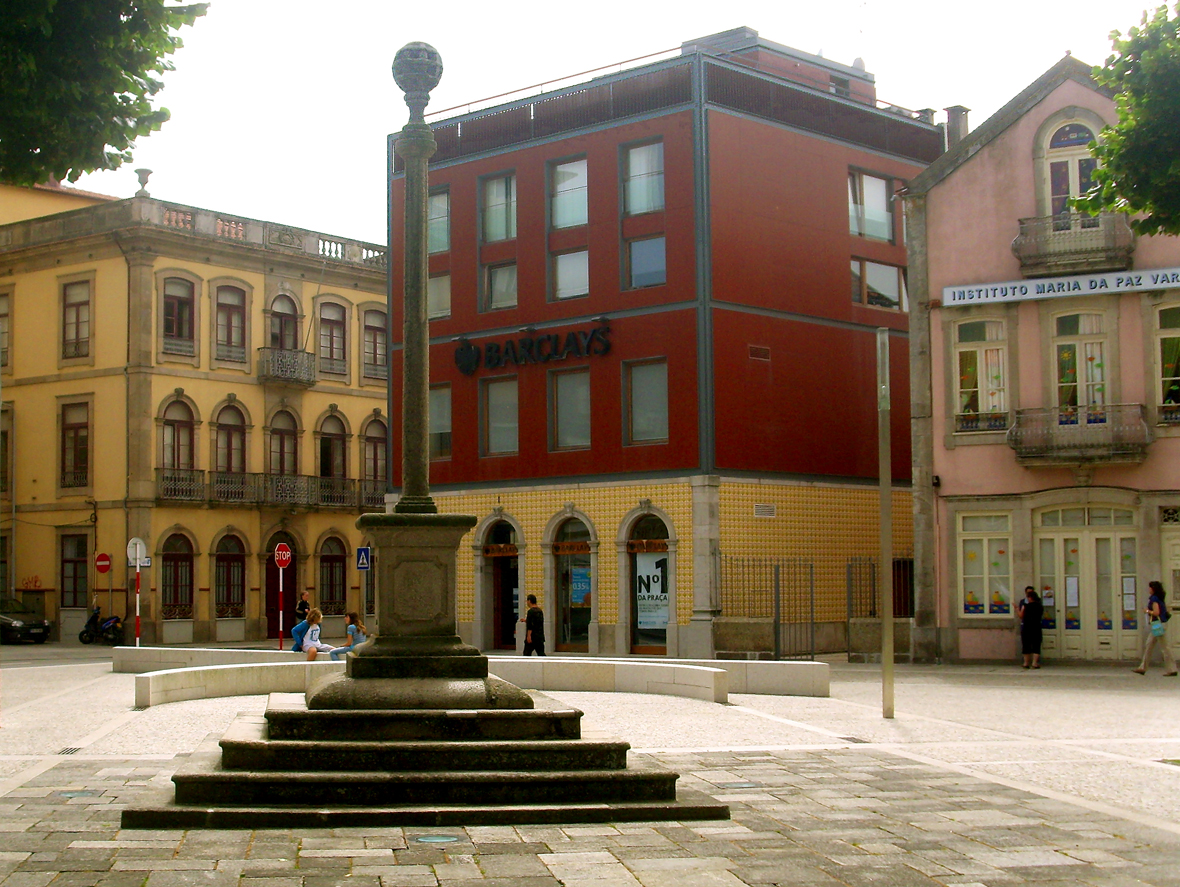
The Pelourinho, the 16th-century town pillory.

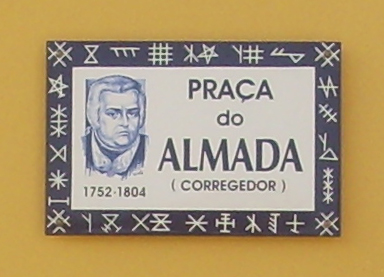
The square's plate. The square name honors an 18th-century politician that prompted Póvoa de Varzim's urban development in the late 1700s.

Praça do Almada (Almada's Square) is the civic center of the city of Póvoa de Varzim in Portugal, and is located in Póvoa de Varzim City Center. It contains the sculpture that pays homage to Eça de Queiroz, a notable writer who was born there.

Praça do Almada is about 14,000 square metres (150,000 sq ft) in area. It is considered by the city as free space and part historical area of Póvoa de Varzim district. In 1791, by the royal provision of Queen Mary I, the old Campo da Calçada became the civic center, initially named Praça Nova, or the New Square in English. It was also the place where the first public garden of Póvoa de Varzim was raised, and popular amongst the 19th century bourgeoisie. A legend speaks of a white owl that flies on the square between eleven thirty p.m. and midnight, which is associated with the incarnation of the soul of a person that deeply loved this square and did not want to ever leave it.

== History ==
=== 16th century: The Calçada ===
The Calçada or Pavement was one of the exits of the urban core of Póvoa de Varzim in the 16th century, at the time the town was centered on Praça Velha, the Old Square. The toponym was assigned to ways, in the North of Portugal, that were paved where it was necessary. To the west, the Calçada ended next to the Town's Pillory of the 1514 royal charter by King Manuel I, that Flávio Gonçalves points out the construction in the reign of King John III, a period of local development. On the Pillory site the development of the Street of the Blacksmiths (Rua dos Ferreiros) was initiated in 1568.

=== 18th century: Praça Nova as the new civic center ===
In time, the field of the Calçada became the town's Market square. The development of Póvoa de Varzim as an important fishery community in the 18th century prompted the royal provision by Queen Mary I. Forwarded by the queen on February 21, 1791, ordering Corregedor Francisco de Almada e Mendonça (the Almada) to reorganize the urbanization of Póvoa de Varzim, namely the creation of a new square in the old market square and substituting the diminished Old Square as the civic center. It was an area already delimited just north of the Calçada.

The royal representative, lieutenant colonel Frenchman Reinaldo Oudinot, to the corregedor, ordered that "That in the Field of the Calçada there should be built a wide square for the markets and other streets and in this Square porch houses should be built, trees, and a fountain in the middle, everything in conformity with Colonel Lieutenant's plant".

Work started in the year 1793 and, shortly after, became the new economic center of Póvoa de Varzim where the markets and fairs had been transferred. As such, in 1800 it was determined: "No-one can buy or sell firewood nor any other sorts of goods except on the Praça Nova of this town where all goods must be put on sale in order to be bought by who wants it."

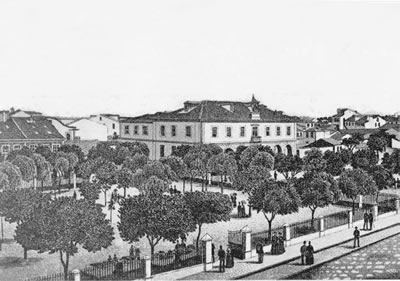
The 19th-century garden.

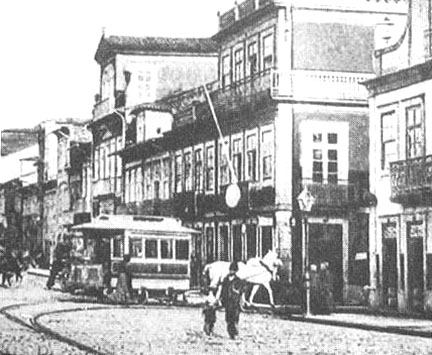
Around 1880, Praça do Almada was a stop for streetcars.

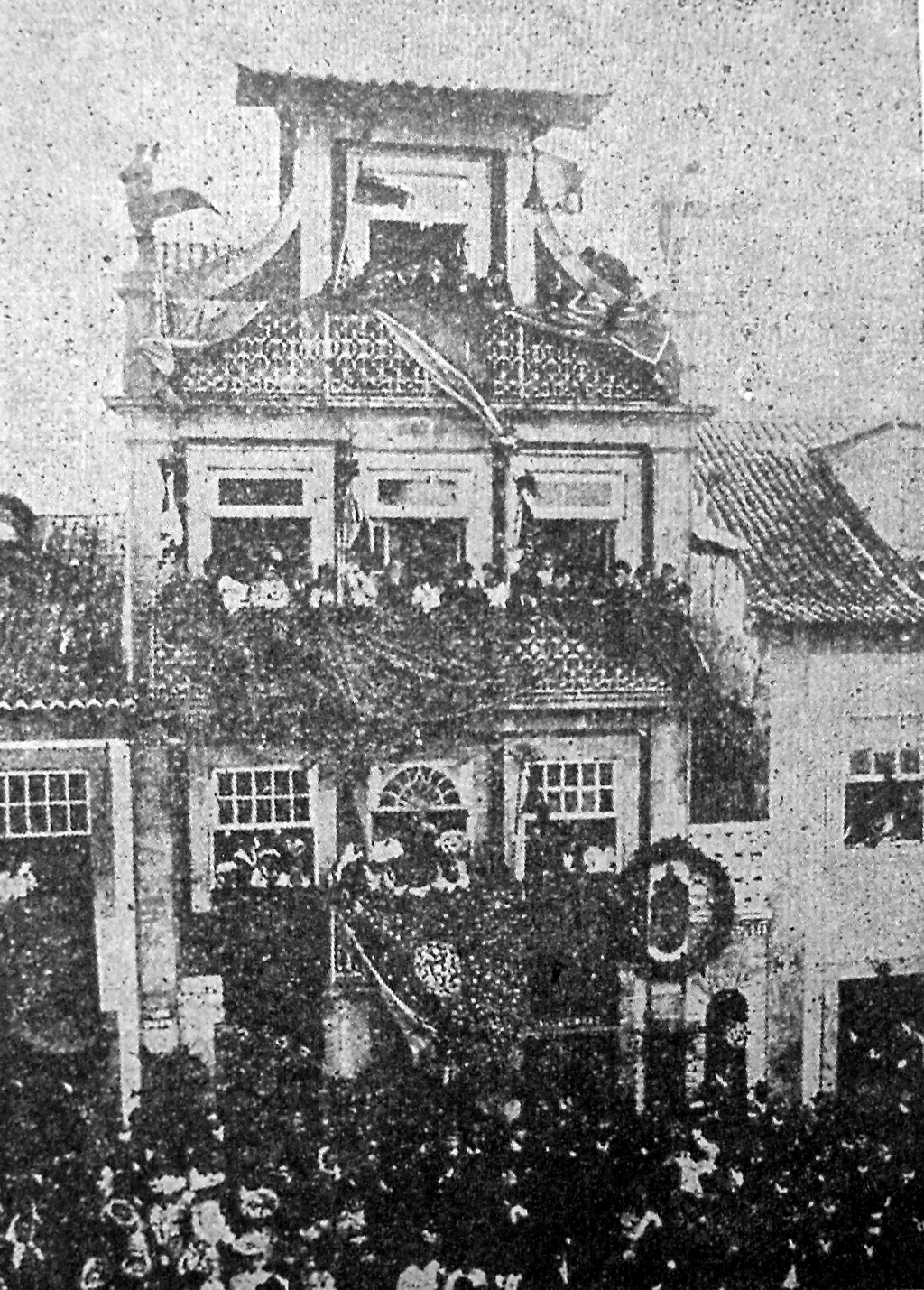
1906 Eça de Queiroz birthplace commemoration.

The square also linked the former civic center, the now Neighbourg of Matriz, to the streets of the bustling fishing neighborhood of Junqueira. In the 18th century the main street was mostly settled by fishermen and the main fishing street of the town. Then the New square later came to be known as the Praça Nova do Almada or Almada's New Square, in honor to the corregedor, for having been one of the main boosters of the Royal Provision by Queen Mary I.

The meeting and leisure usefulness of the square was favored by the raising of the arches of the new town hall building, as it protected people from the weather. The new city hall, which was occupied in 1807, turned the new square into the political hub of the town.

=== 19th century: The public garden ===
Praça do Almada also had the intention of being a public garden, trendy in the 19th century, to be used by the high bourgeoisie. A proper market square was constructed in May 1873, with an elegant fountain in cast iron. However, it was considered that the daily market removed dignity to the civic center and a new market square was inaugurated in Praça do Marquês de Pombal square in 1904, and the fountain transferred to Dores Square, today in the garden of the Senhor do Monte street.

The first efforts to build a gazebo occurred in 1896. It was an ephemeral structure, given that the current Art Nouveau iron-cast gazebo was constructed at the site in 1904. This gazebo was inaugurated in 1905 with a play by the Povoense Band. The stage became not only a hub for plays and concerts, but also for meetings and debates.

Eça de Queiroz was born in Praça do Almada in 1845, in the old number 1 of Praça do Almada, house that opens up on São Sebastião square, currently named Eça de Queiroz Square due to this event. Carolina, his mother, dated Teixeira de Queiroz to whom became pregnant, to hide the pregnancy, Carolina moves to the house of her sister, Augusta Pereira d' Eça where the child was born.

In 1906, to celebrate the birth of one of the greatest writers in the Portuguese language, a crowds gathers around the house, and a bronze plate, by Master Teixeira Lopes, is placed. The plate was offered by the Portuguese of Brazil. The original house was controversially rebuilt in early 20th century, but the plate saved and placed on the newly built house.

== Urban morphology ==
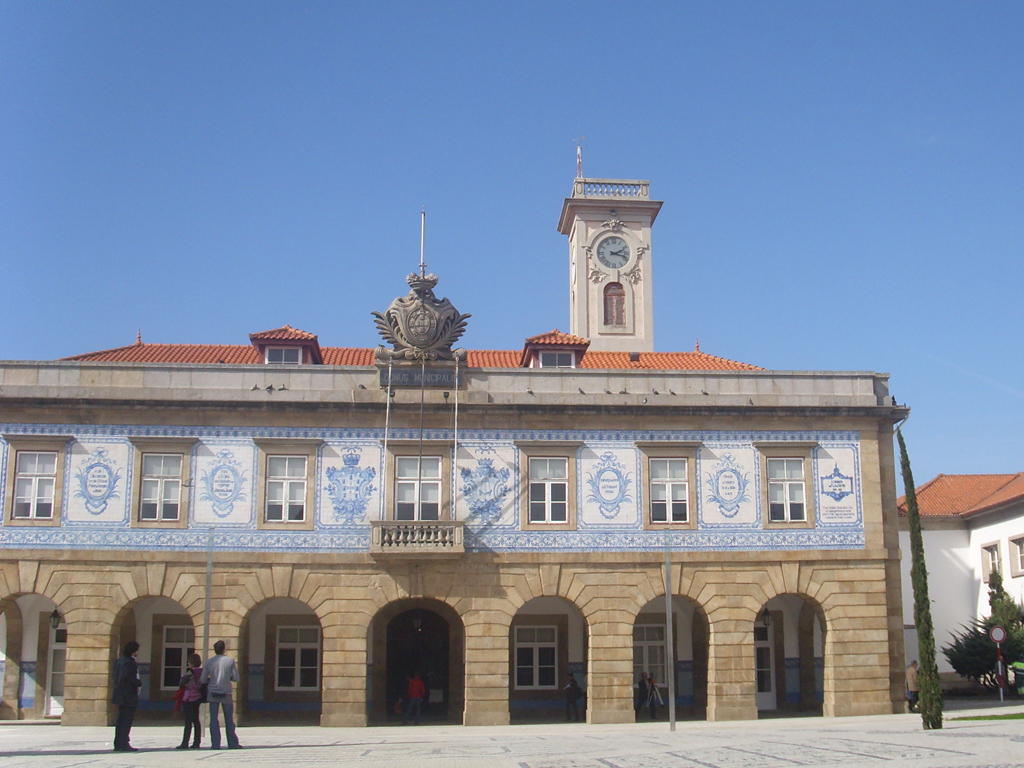
The City Hall with the 1790-1791 arches by French engineer Reinaldo Oudinot.

The square is landscaped in an egg-shape, cut in half by the National Highway 13, and is tipped by buildings with long-established national style. The building of the City Hall (1791), located in the north section, dominates the square and is of neoclassical design in the taste of the English settlement in Porto. This English influence is visible in the arches of ashlar masonry on the ground floor, with tiling, to the Portuguese taste, added in 1908-10 by Rocha Peixoto, of the authorship of the Belgian painter Joseph Bialman. In front of the city hall, the square's ground has drawings with the blazon of the city and some siglas poveiras, considered of cultural interest and kept after the latest square rearrangement in 2007.

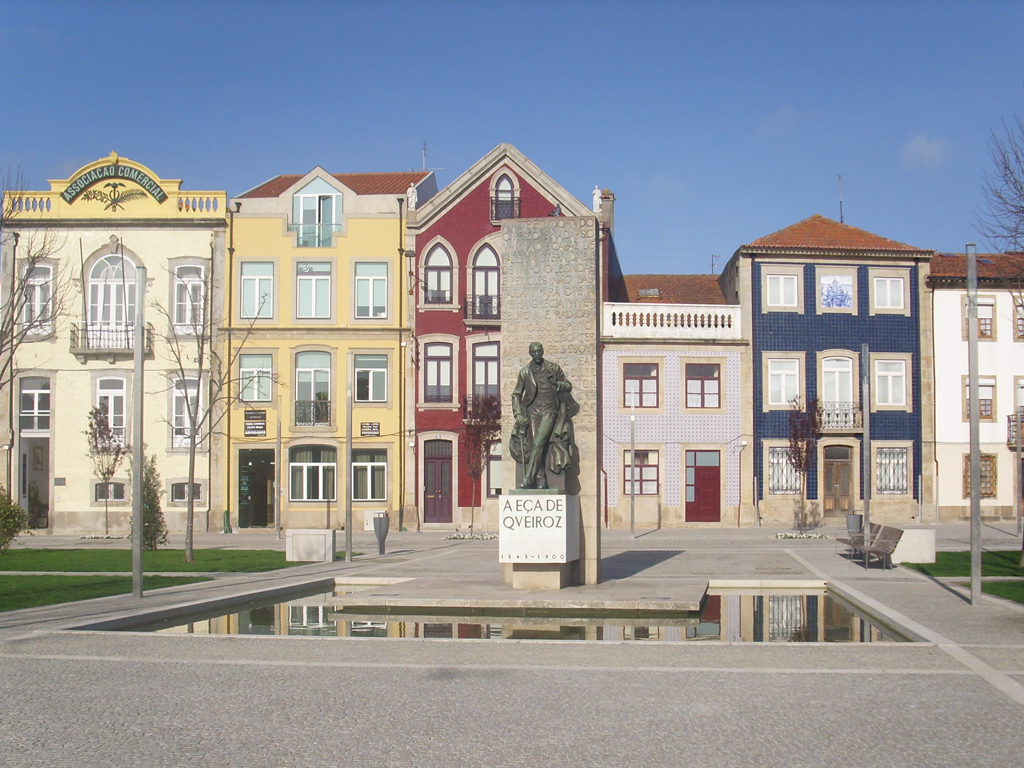
Statue of Eça de Queiroz in the square's east end.

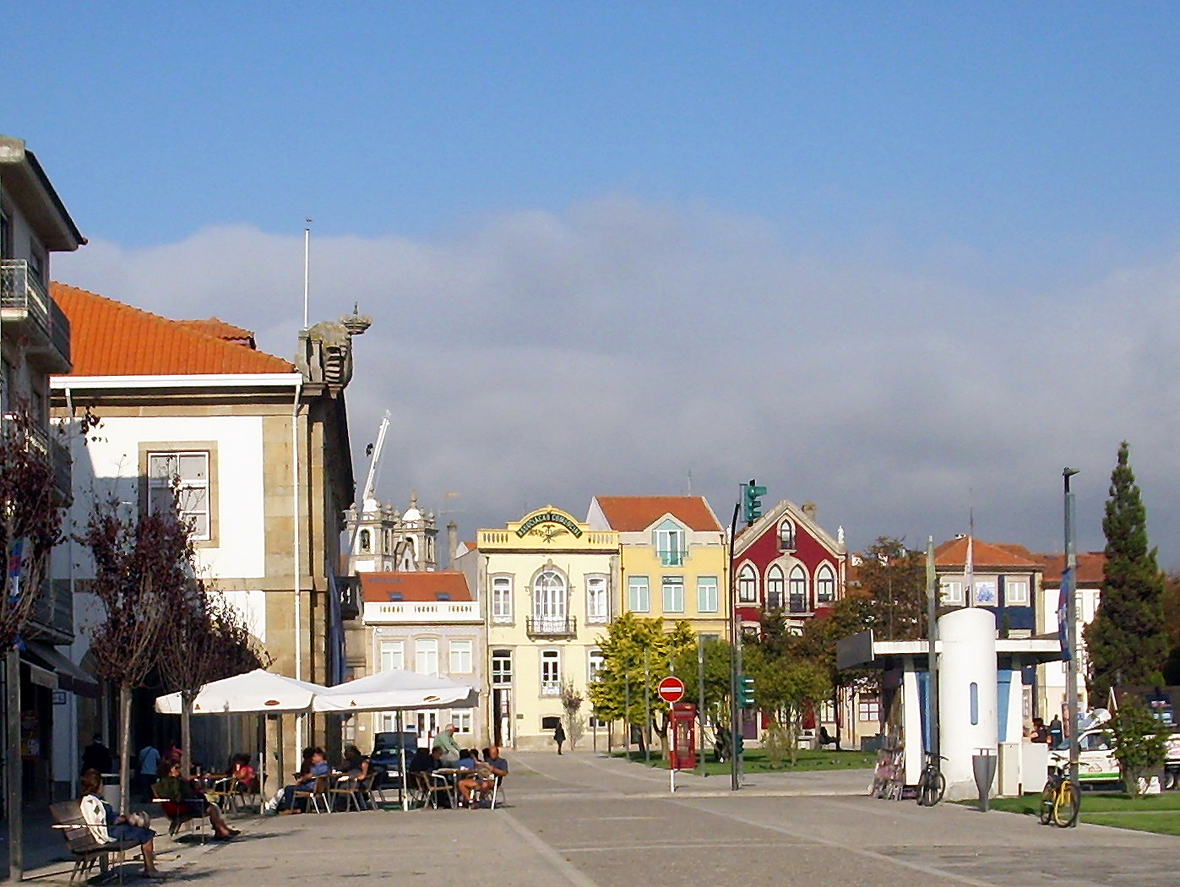
Praça do Almada with the city's Main Church, located in the Old Square, visible in the background.

To the west of the square is the Manueline pillory of Póvoa de Varzim, erected in 1514. It is a national monument and represents the municipal emancipation of Póvoa de Varzim. In front and in another part of the square, there's the Statue of Eça de Queirós, erected in 1952. It is of the authorship of Master Leopoldo de Almeida. The monument was offered by Povoan settlers in Rio de Janeiro. Next to the pillory, the square's historical and romantic gazebo follows the liking of the old Povoan bourgeoisie for its spare time. With hexagonal plant, the gazebo is an illustration of cast iron architecture, with a very noticeable oriental influence, despite being stylized and geometric.

Praça do Almada is a hub for different city districts. Through the streets of Sousa Campos and the Junqueira shopping streets, one can reach the waterfront. Through the streets of Paulo Barreto and Gomes de Amorim, the northern and densely urbanized area of the city is reached. Eça de Queiroz Square, Praça do Almada has direct access to Bairro da Matriz, the most traditional quarter, and through to Ferreiros Street, a road from the 16th century that until the 19th century was used to get to Vila do Conde and Porto, links the main square to the notorious fishing neighborhood known as Bairro Sul.

=== Listed heritage ===
According to Plano de Urbanização da Póvoa de Varzim:

- Praça do Almada (free space with patrimonial importance).
- Pelourinho - Pillory of Póvoa de Varzim
- Gazeto of Praça do Almada
- Póvoa de Varzim City Hall
- Old Hotel Universal
- Eça de Queiroz House
- São Sebastião Fountain
- Cruzeiro verde - Calvary
