= Praça Velha =

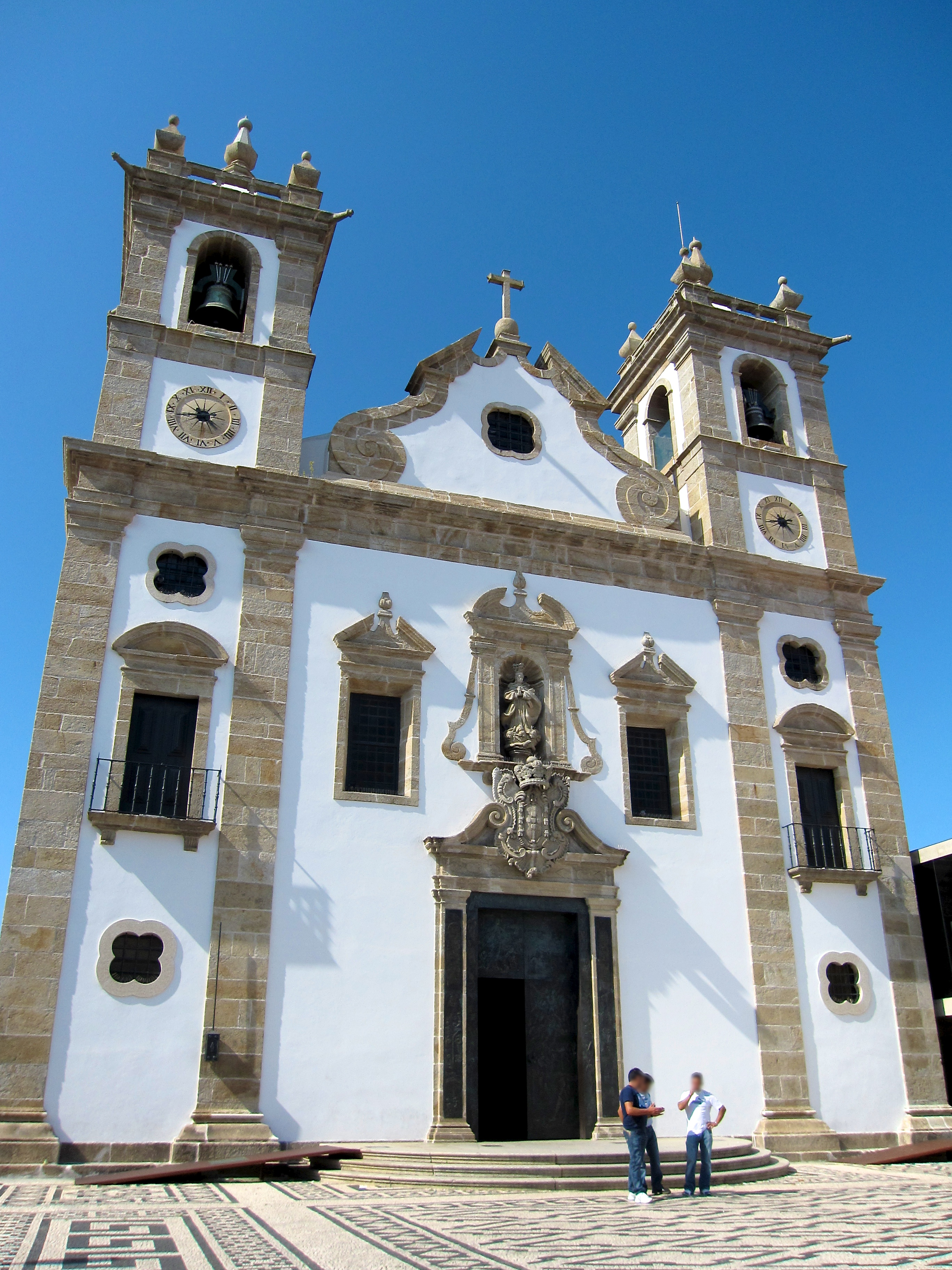
The new Mother Church of Póvoa de Varzim started being built in 1743.

Praça Velha (Old Square), formerly known as Praça (Square), was the primitive civic center and the market square of the city of Póvoa de Varzim in Portugal. It is located in Bairro da Matriz historic district and is surrounded by the main church of Póvoa de Varzim (Igreja Matriz), the primitive Town Hall and the house of a notable 17th-century Póvoa de Varzim seafarer.

Since the Middle Ages the Praça has been used for markets and fairs, to such an extent that the term "Praça" is often used for "market" in the local parlance. Praça Velha became the town's urban core in the Late Middle Ages and was located in the royal land established by the early Portuguese kings after disputes with the Lords of Varzim. Throw Rua de São Pedro street, it bordered the Varzim Old town square, the core of the medieval fiefdom of Varzim. With the Age of Discovery, the area around the square developed with rich architecture built by the seafarers, a local bourgeoisie, and declined with the 1791 royal provision which established the new town square, Praça do Almada.

== History ==
=== 14th century: the town's new urban core ===
In 1308, King Denis wrote a charter in which he gave his royal land in Varzim to 54 local families. The inhabitants would have to create a "Póvoa", a new settlement in Varzim, bordered to the south by the primitive Roman and Early Medieval core of the Town of Varzim, which was controlled by knights under a feudal structure. King Denis also encouraged the creation of free fairs all around the kingdom. In time, the Praça became the site of the free fair and the location for the public butchery. It was a wide area bordered by the Town Hall (from the 15th century) and the Madre Deus Chapel (prior to 1521).

The early Town Hall governed the municipality from the Praça from the first half of the 16th century and probably much earlier. The building was probably built in the 15th century and originally had an arcade structure.

=== 16th century: the impact of the Age of Discovery ===
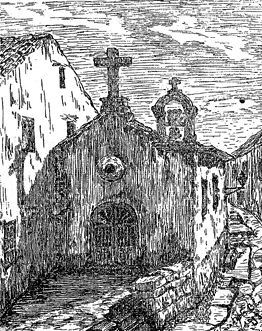
Madre de Deus Chapel.

In the 16th century, single storey houses dominated the town's landscape, but there are indications of multiple floored habitations, with curved lintels and sculpted exterior facades. This more advanced architecture is associated with rich gentlemen who had made their fortunes through seafaring. These included Amador Alvares, explorer of the route to India, and navigators Pedro Fernandes, Diogo Pyz de São Pedro, Lourenço Dias and others. This bourgeoisie was the owner of most of the real estate around the square which the population saw as the urban area.

The Madre Deus Chapel was built, possibly before 1521, by nobleman João Gomes Gaio, father of the knight João Martins Gaio, related with the maritime trade of Vila do Conde. He lived in Póvoa civic center because there he could easily recruit men. This noble and influential family provided great benefits to Póvoa during that period. Madre Deus Chapel was an important building, popular amongst the common people due to its central location in the town and even more popular than the first church, the ancient Senhora de Varzim Church, located in Dores Square in the old town.

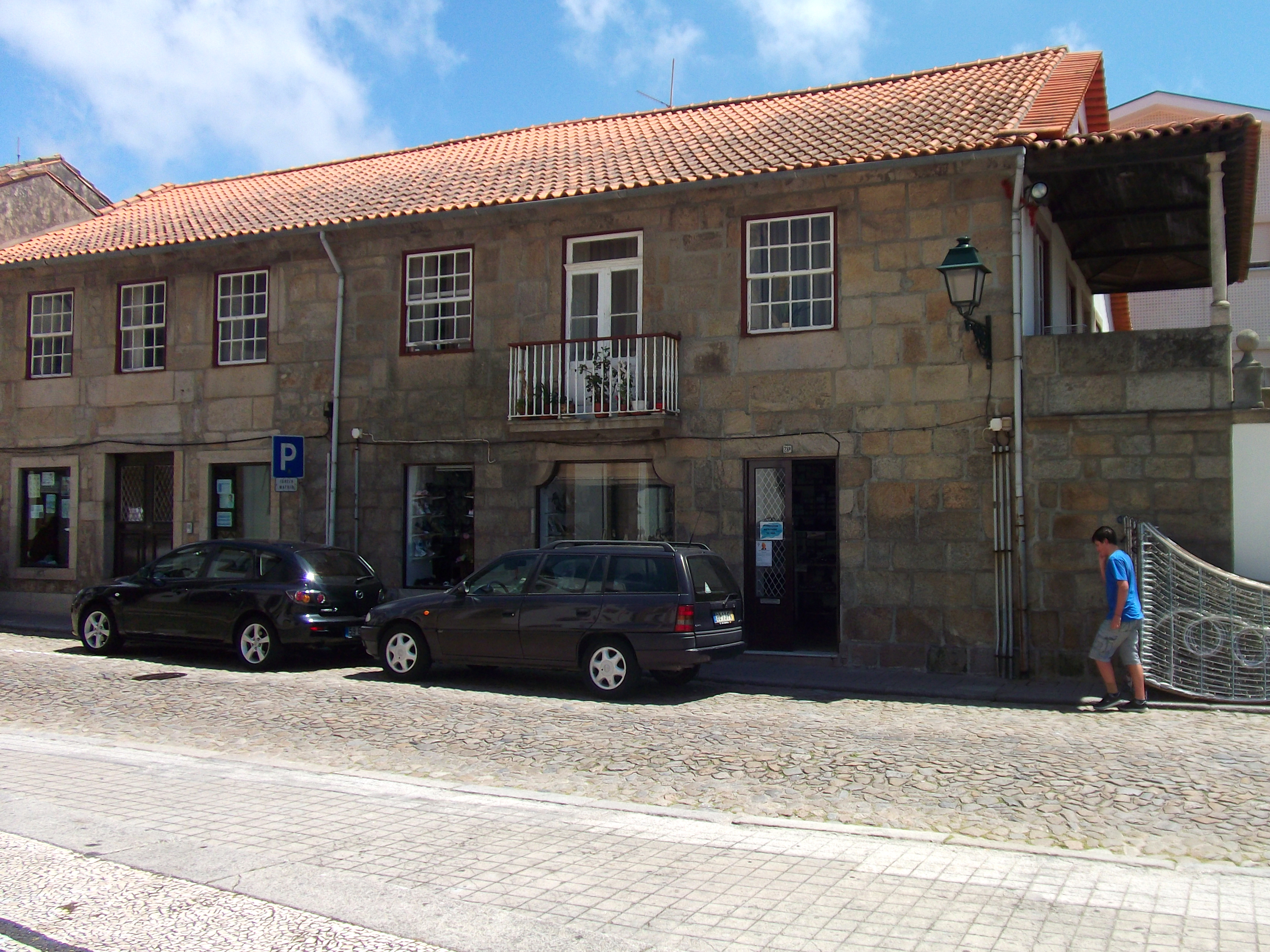
House of António Cardia. Pilot-major of the Portuguese Armada during the defense of Bahia in 1624. Cardia also established the local Holy Week Celebrations in 1687.

Due to its central location and position of safety, unlike the main church, the ordinary judge of the town, councilmen and people asked the archbishop of Braga in 1544 for "a license to place the Holy Sacrament in the sacrarium". This was granted and lead to the establishment of the Corpus Christi Procession in the town. Since 1591, the clergymen of the parishes of Beiriz, Amorim, Terroso and Estela were obliged to participate in this. Their number was augmented from 1625 by priests from Laundos, Navais and Argivai, causing protests by Vila do Conde in 1637 concerning the growing importance that Póvoa was getting in the region.

Those surrounding parishes were integrated by the civil administration into the Municipality of Póvoa de Varzim after the liberal reforms of 1836. João Martins Gaio and his wife, Maria Afonso, were the chapel administrators. They and their son, Jorge Martins Gaio, were authorized to be buried in the chapel "with the coat of arms carved in rock, by authorization of the archbishop of Braga venerated Sir Barthelomeu dos Martires, given during the visit to the Town of Esposende in January 13th, 1560."

The area between the Madre Deus Chapel and the Town Hall, referred to as a "square of this town" in 1596, was the true civic center, coming close to the role that a square played in a medieval city, where a cathedral or church dominated, the market took place and where the most important buildings of the city were built. The building of the Town Hall supplied the square with arches that were used as protection from the sun or rain, in this way it was the hub of public life. The local prison was also located on the Town Hall's ground floor.

Several streets reached the Praça, these linked the urban core with the suburbs and were used by travelers from neighboring cities and towns, such as Barcelos, Braga, Guimarães, and Vila do Conde. Thus, with this conjugation of religious, administrative and commercial factors the Praça was a busy place.

=== 18th-century developments ===
The Town Hall was rebuilt in 1713, when the Praça still had a wide square. Lieutenant Francisco Felix da Veiga Leal said in 1758 "Póvoa de Varzim has a very good town hall with the town's coat of arms painted on the ceiling of the hearing room. These same coat of arms are used in its senate standard ... and on the outside wall the Royal coat of arms are located. And this house is formed over six arches with its casing, and below it the bars of the two prison cells."

On February 18, 1743, the building of the new First Church of Póvoa de Varzim near the town hall was started, revealing the alliance between the Povoan Town Hall and the Archdiocese of Braga. This was useful in the territorial disputes that the town had with the House of Bragança, specifically its Town of Barcelos. The Town Hall was part of the First Church Commission and developed efforts for the maintenance and enlargement of the old first church, the Church of Santa Maria de Varzim, as well as for the construction of the new one. It enjoyed special privileges granted by the Braga archbishops: the judge of the Town Hall was also judge of the church. In 1610, these privileges had already become entrenched in tradition and were respected, even if they were against the orders (Capítulos) emanating from the archdiocese.

The new church opened to the public on January 6, 1757. It was of a large size and high artistic value for such a small, but growing, community. With the new church, the parochial community expanded to include nearby parishes such as Terroso and Amorim, where there were only very small chapels. After the building of the new church, the Praça became quadrangular in shape and was diminished in size, not only because of the church but also due to other buildings that had been constructed.

=== The 1791 Royal Provision and decline ===
By the end of the 18th century, it was apparent that the Town Hall, which was also a judiciary court and a prison, was too small for the expanding town. With the Royal Provision, made by Queen Mary I in 1791, the Praça Nova (the "New Square") was created with a larger town hall. The old town hall was given new functions and its style was modified with time. By the late 19th century, the Madre Deus chapel was demolished for street enlargement.

The importance of the Praça as the civic, economic and political center started to be broken down after the 1791 Royal Provision which restructured the urban arrangement of Póvoa de Varzim and relocated the municipal powers to the new square.

== Urban morphology ==
=== Listed heritage ===
- Main Church of Póvoa de Varzim
- Old Town Hall
- House of António Cardia (16th-century seafarer)
- São Sebastião House and Chapel
