= Lapa Church =

Coordinates: 41°22′25.72″N 8°45′41.46″W

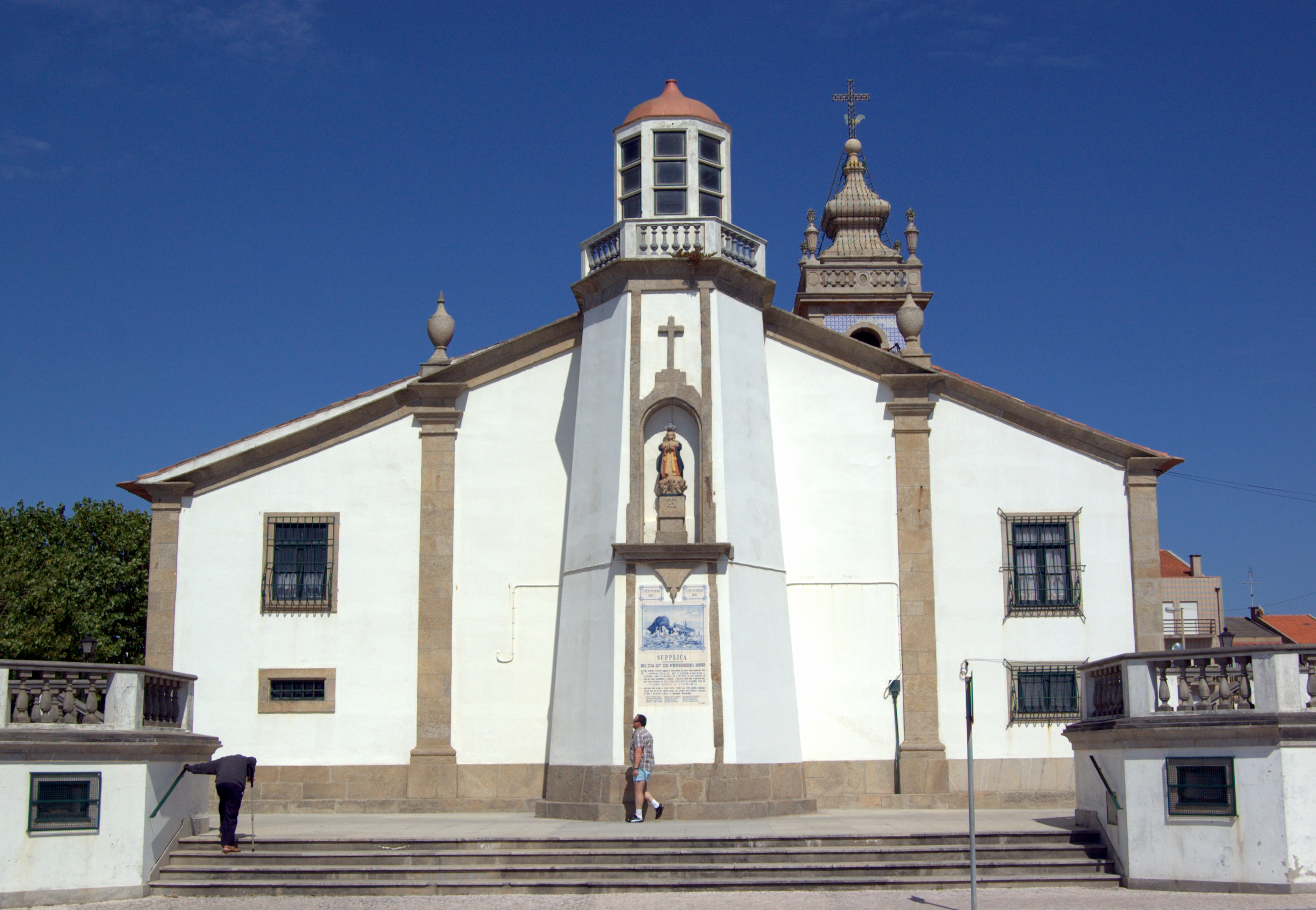
Lighthouse of Lapa Church.

Lapa Church, officially Parish Church of Our Lady of Lapa (Portuguese: Igreja Paroquial de Nossa Senhora da Lapa) is a Parish church in the Portuguese city of Póvoa de Varzim. It was built in 1772 by the local fishermen community. Despite its simplicity it has some interesting features and cultural interest such its old lighthouse, once a link between the church and the fishermen at sea.

Traditional marriage marks, Siglas poveiras, can be found in the church. it is a seaside church and lighthouse, near the seashore in the Port of Póvoa de Varzim.

== History ==
The establishment of the chapel is due to Spanish missionaries, Franciscan friars, in the third quarter of the 18th century. They got the support of some local fishermen to create a chapel in honor of Our Lady of the rock (Lapa). The foundation stone was placed on December 9, 1770. Works finished on August 15, 1772, with a solemn blessing. The founders organized themselves as a brotherhood, this status was later confirmed by Maria I of Portugal in 1791, as a Royal brotherhood, the Real Irmandade de N. S. da Assunção, the Royal Brotherhood of our Lady of Assumption, still in existence.

Póvoa de Varzim's inhabitants showed great devotion for this chapel to such extent that the brotherhood created a good lighthouse in there, with two-lights with Petrol fuel. It served for navigation, especially for the fishermen.

== See also ==
- Póvoa de Varzim
- Churches in Portugal
