= Regufe =

Neighborhood of Póvoa de Varzim, Portugal

Regufe
Part	Matriz/Mariadeira
Colours	Green and red
Symbol	Farol de Regufe
Association	G.R. Regufe
Civil parish(es)	Póvoa de Varzim Parish
Religious parish(es)	Matriz
Neighbourhoods of Póvoa de Varzim

Regufe is a neighborhood of the Portuguese city of Póvoa de Varzim. Located in the southern part of Matriz / Mariadeira district, the area is mostly residential development. Farol de Regufe, a metallic lighthouse painted red, is the symbol of the quarter.

== History ==
Regufe is an ancient place: a former village around the town of Póvoa de Varzim. Regufe's name is of Suebi origin from Rekaufus: Rec + wulf (wolf). It was recorded as a village in 16th-century documents.

Today its origins as a farming and cattle area with woodlands are visible in certain parts of Regufe, mostly on the border with Vila do Conde.

== Organisations ==
The community has Grupo Recreativo Regufe, a nonprofit that organises sports activities for youth.
