= Parque da Cidade =

Park and district in Portugal

Coordinates: 41.399°N 8.756°W

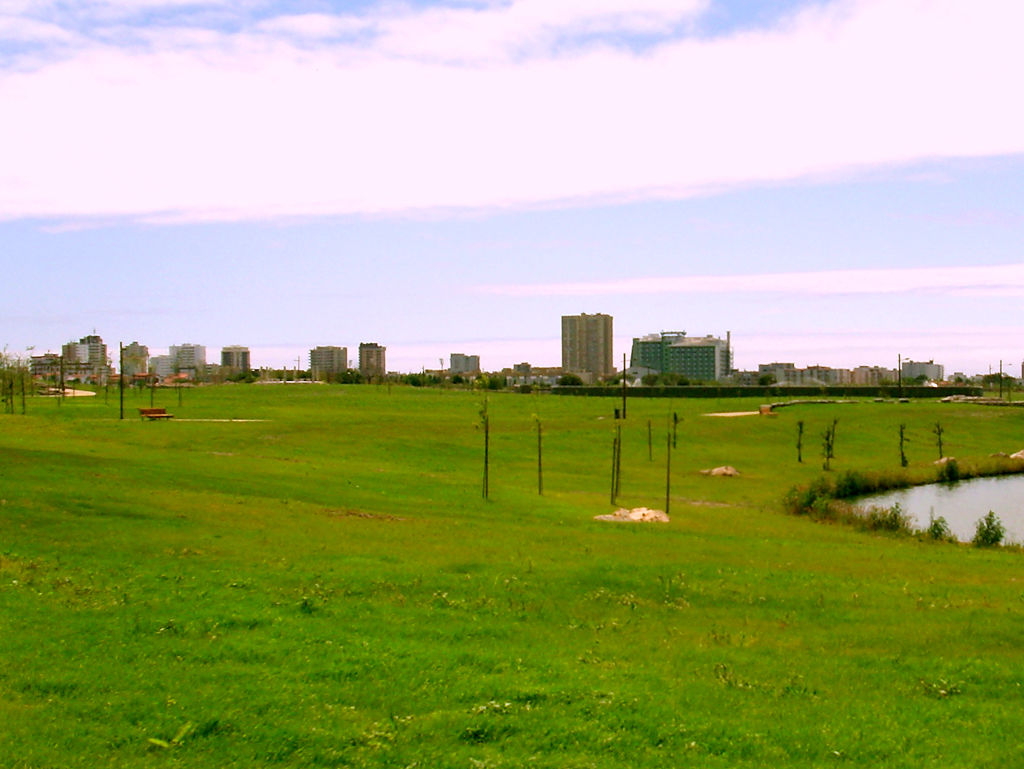
View from the city park

Parque da Cidade is a district of Porto, Portugal. It literally means City Park, as it is where the city's park is located and occupies most of the land area. This part of the city is set in four distinct parishes: Porto and Matosinhos.

The music festival Primavera Sound Porto has been held in the park since 2012.
