= Bairro Norte =

Coordinates: 41.3805711°N 8.7569062°W

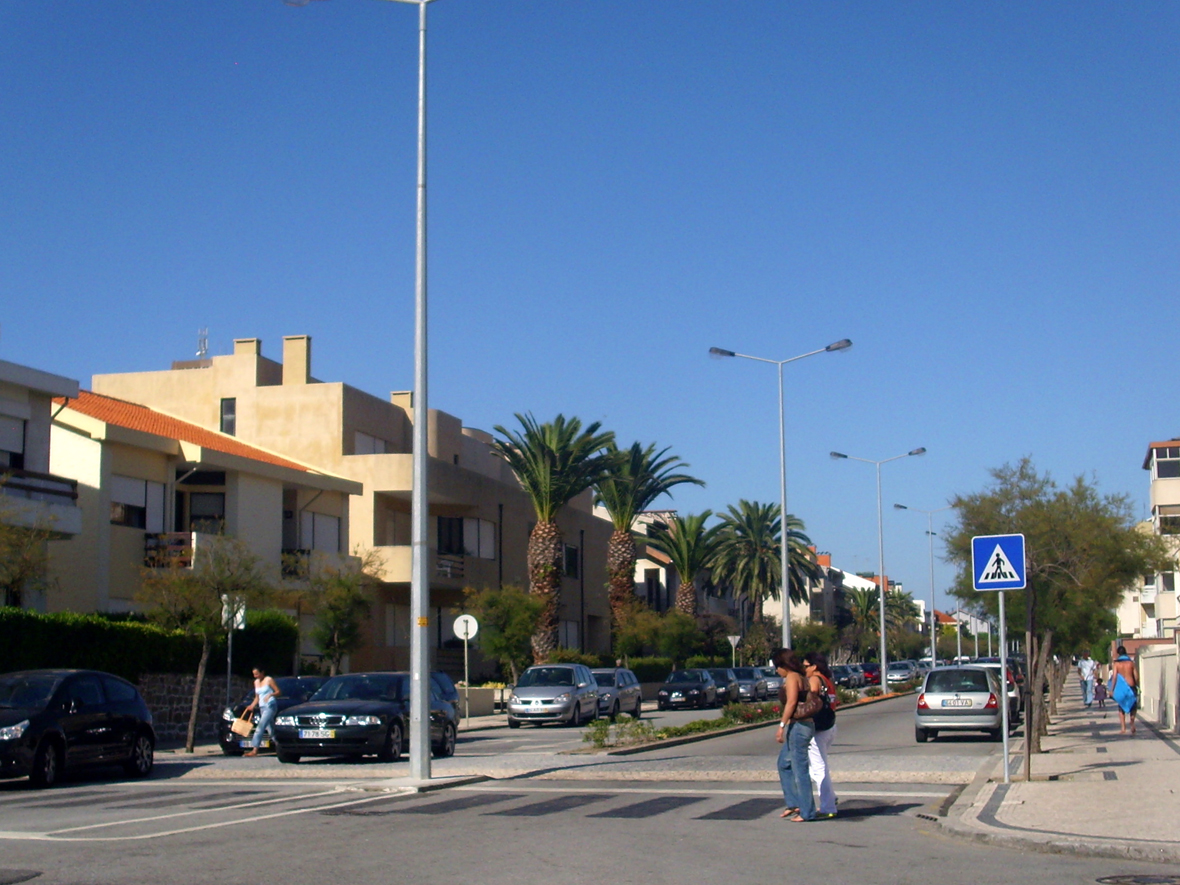
Avenida Santos Graça.

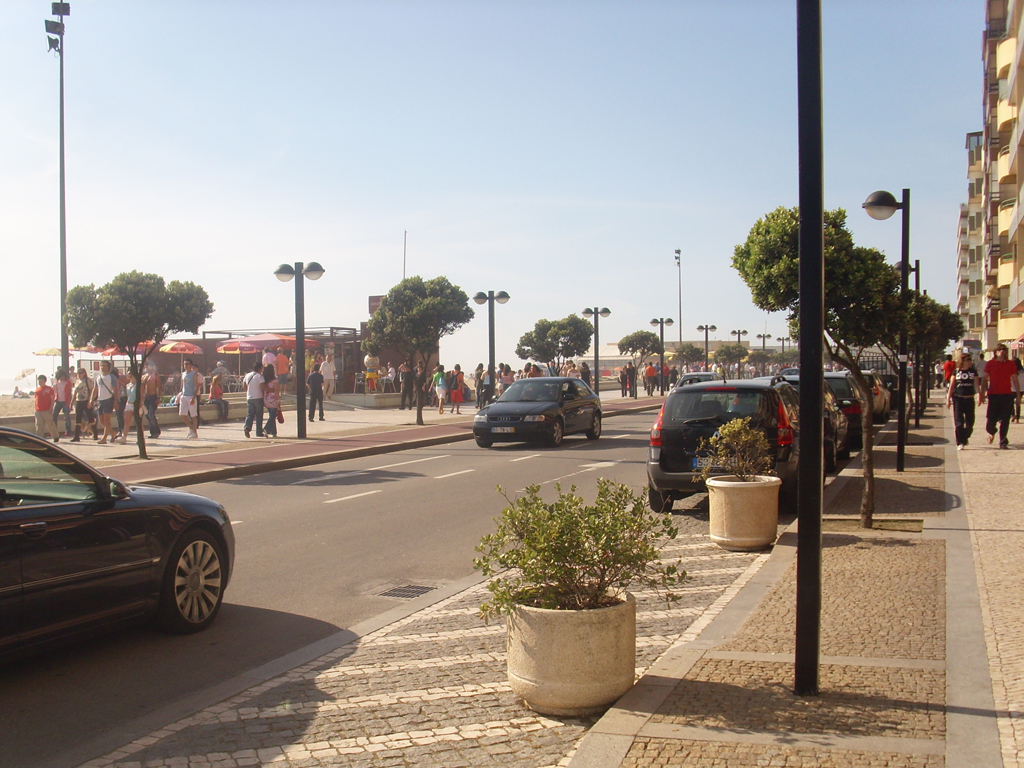
Avenida dos Banhos (Baths Avenue) is the beach avenue of Póvoa de Varzim, and one of the city's most famous landmarks.

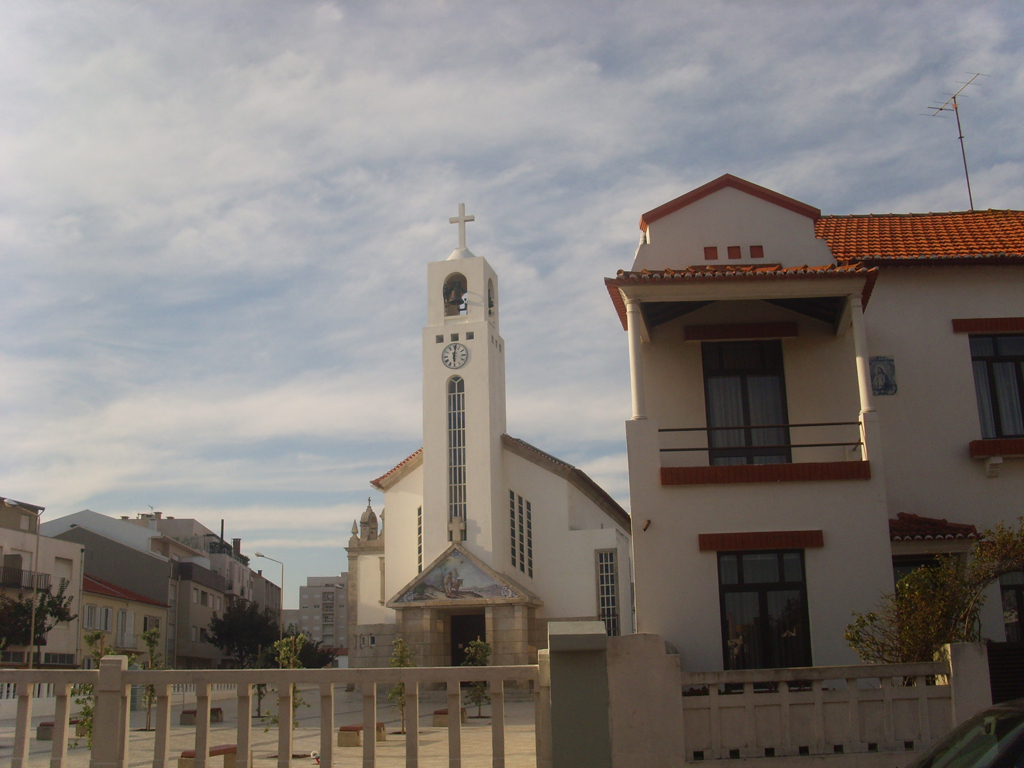
Desterro Chapel. The Festival of Desterro is one of the most typical and known by its flower carpets that cover some of the quarter's streets.

Bairro Norte (North Quarter) is a quarter and district of the Portuguese city of Póvoa de Varzim. it is the most densely populated district of the city, it is also a beach resort. In the 19th century it was known as Bairro de S. José.

== History ==
The urbanization of Bairro Norte started when, King John VI by the Royal Provision of November 14, 1825, confirmed the possession of the beaches north of the seaport wall to the fishermen of Póvoa . A priest called for a portion of the beach north of the seaport wall to the city hall in order to build a chapel dedicated to Saint Joseph. City Hall authorized the idea on September 16, 1837.

In the 19th century was already a bustling fishing neighborhood, but it was already developing as a beach district. This development led to gentrification processes in the typical fisher streets of Bairro Norte such as Ramalhão and Norte streets during most of the 20th century.

== Geography ==
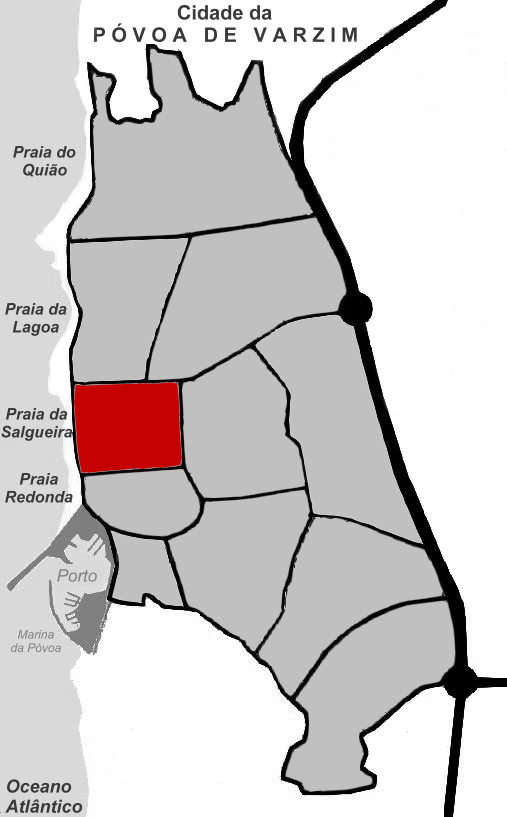
Location of Bairro Norte district in the city of Póvoa de Varzim.

Bairro Norte developed at the beginning of the 20th century with streets parallel to the sea, resembling Bairro Sul. It became a beach resort and became very urbanized (the most populous area with high buildings, but some areas kept traditional Portuguese houses and small streets). This neighbourhood has triggered the development of neighbouring areas, such as Agro-Velho, Barreiros, and Parque da Cidade.

The new district center, with residential blocks and street shops, is being built after the displacement of a rope-making factory.

== Festivals ==
The main festivals of the neighbourhood are the Senhora do Desterro Festival with flower carpets in the most traditional neighbourhoods streets and Bairro Norte Saint Peter's festival.
