= Bairro Sul =

Coordinates: 41.3767362°N 8.7607344°W

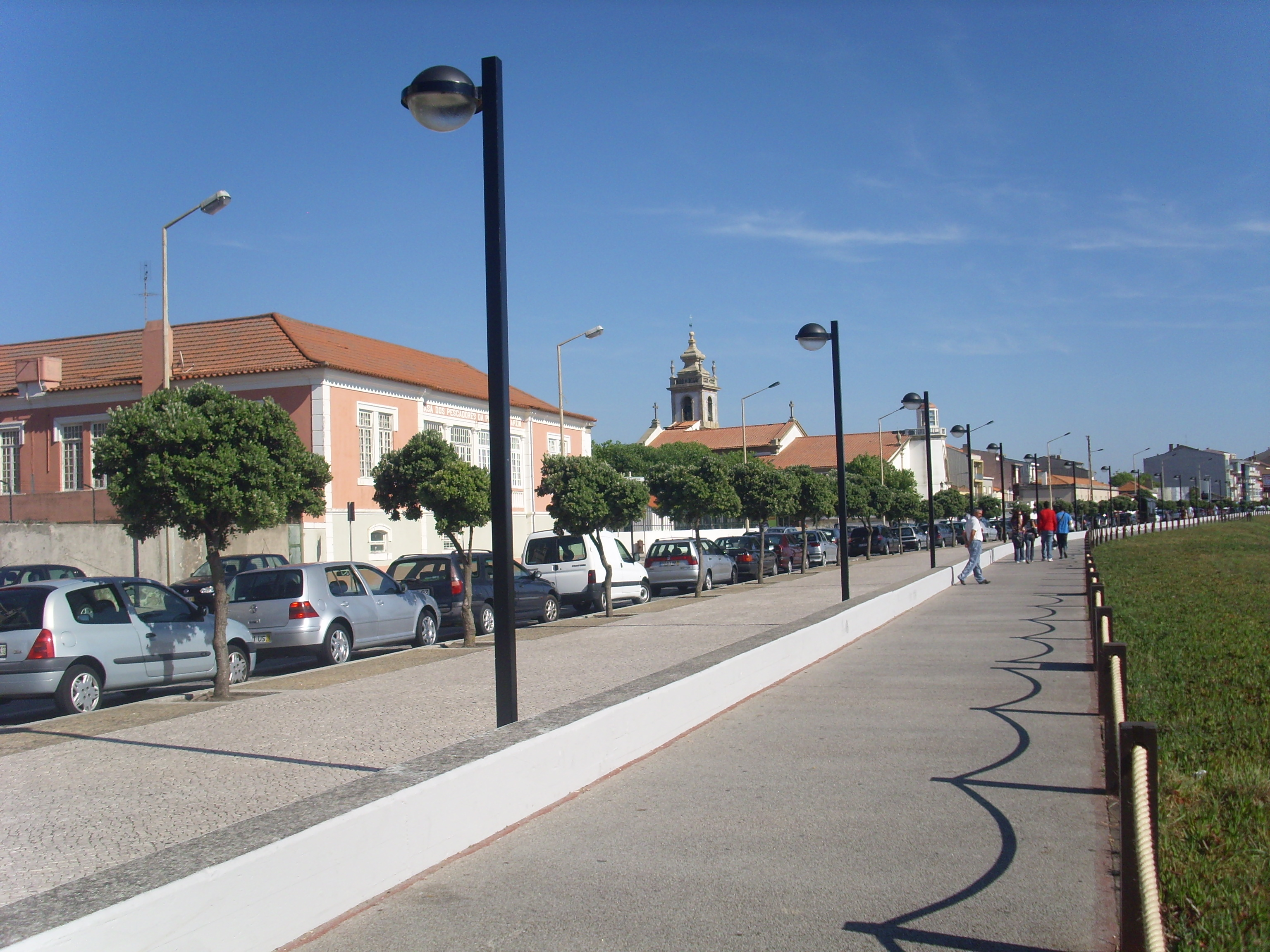
Fishermen House (Casa dos Pescadores) and Lapa Church in Descobrimentos Avenue along the sheltered bay

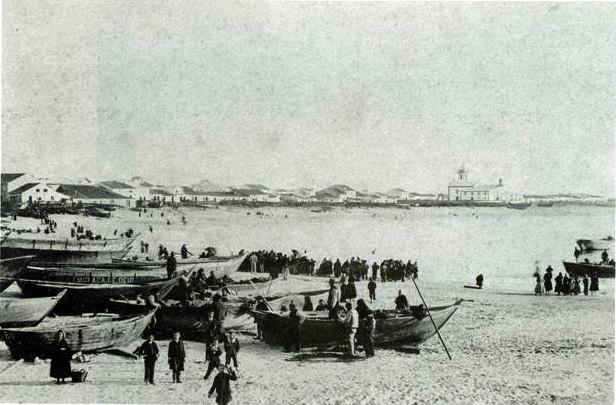
View of the quarter in c.1836

Bairro Sul, literally the South Neighborhood, also known as Lapa, is the fishery district of the city of Póvoa de Varzim in Portugal. It is one of the six traditional neighborhoods of Póvoa de Varzim and one of the eleven parts in which the city is subdivided. The quarter is situated south of Póvoa de Varzim City Center. It has green and white as neighborhood colors and Lancha Poveira as symbol, also the icon of the city.

== History ==
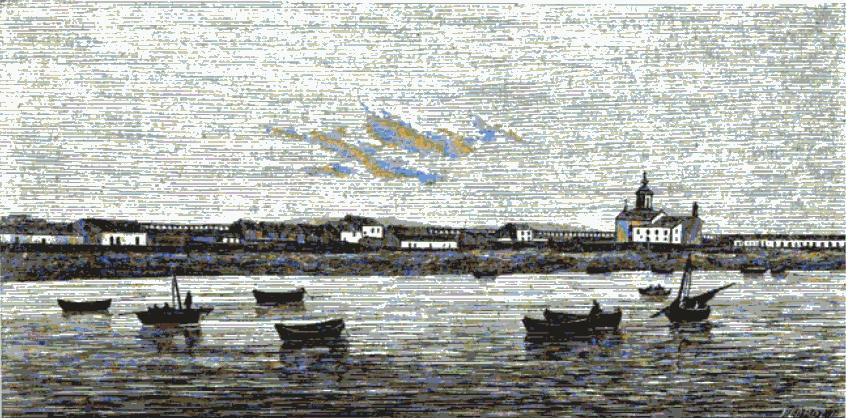
View of the neighborhood from the sheltered bay in 1868.

The Nossa Senhora da Lapa Brotherhood, founded in 1761, asked in 1767 for rights and privileges in "Chãos de Areia" (Sand ground) to establish their homes in there. these fisherman originally lived in downtown. The structure of parallel streets to the seaport of Póvoa de Varzim was already reasonably developed in this century.

Raul Brandão describes the quarter as "two side streets on the sand, Eskimos burrow, dark, smoky, fish reeking, with branches stacked in the sand, and rays drying to the sun for Winter consumption." When the fishermen community became prosperous, still in the 18th century, the quarter grew to the area of Poça da Barca, still around Póvoa bay, that certain historical documents placed in the territory of the town of Vila do Conde.

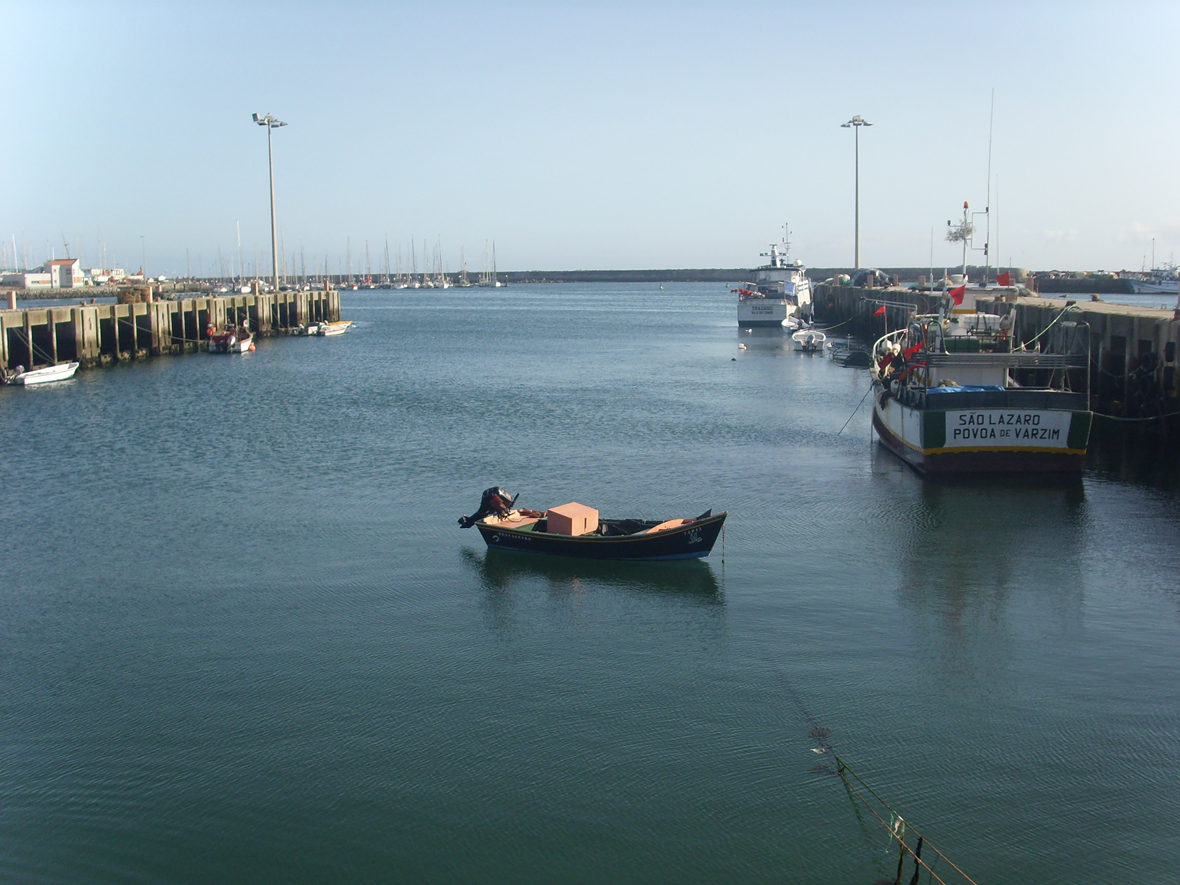
Póvoa de Varzim's seaport was built on the sheltered bay in the 1930s.

In 1853, due to the size of Póvoa de Varzim, larger than some cities, the Town Hall considers the creation of the parish of Lapa, given that the Póvoa was, then, divided into four districts. In 1858 it suggested the creation of the new civil parish which would include this neighborhood and the places of Poça da Barca, Regufe and Gandarinha to the Areia calvary in the limit of Poça da Barca and Caxinas, locations in the territory of Vila do Conde. A commission was nominated, with another one from Vila do Conde, who would present the project. On March 15, 1858, the Civil Government stated that the Póvoa should trade the locations of Cerca and Quintela of Argivai (because those are contiguous with Vila do Conde), for the one of Porça da Barca and Regufe, as it requested. However, on the following day, a new statement declared harmful to Vila do Conde such annexation, although the population of Poça da Barca also requested the annexation.

At the end of the 19th century, the over-fishing by steamships authorized by the national government, namely with small mesh net that caught even the youngest fish, making the once abundant fish, that led to the prosperity of the community, starting to vanish significantly, creating severe social problems and emigration. But, in this century, the community had already enlarged even further to Vila do Conde territory. The religious parishes of Lapa, without the civil form, appeared in 1935 and in Vila do Conde the Parish of Caxinas and Poça da Barca appeared in 1944.

== Geography ==
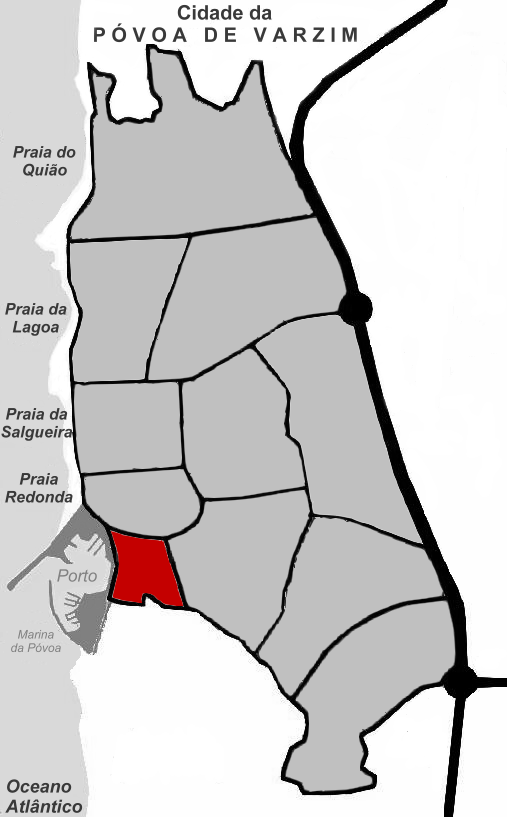
Bairro Sul highlighted in the urban area of Póvoa de Varzim

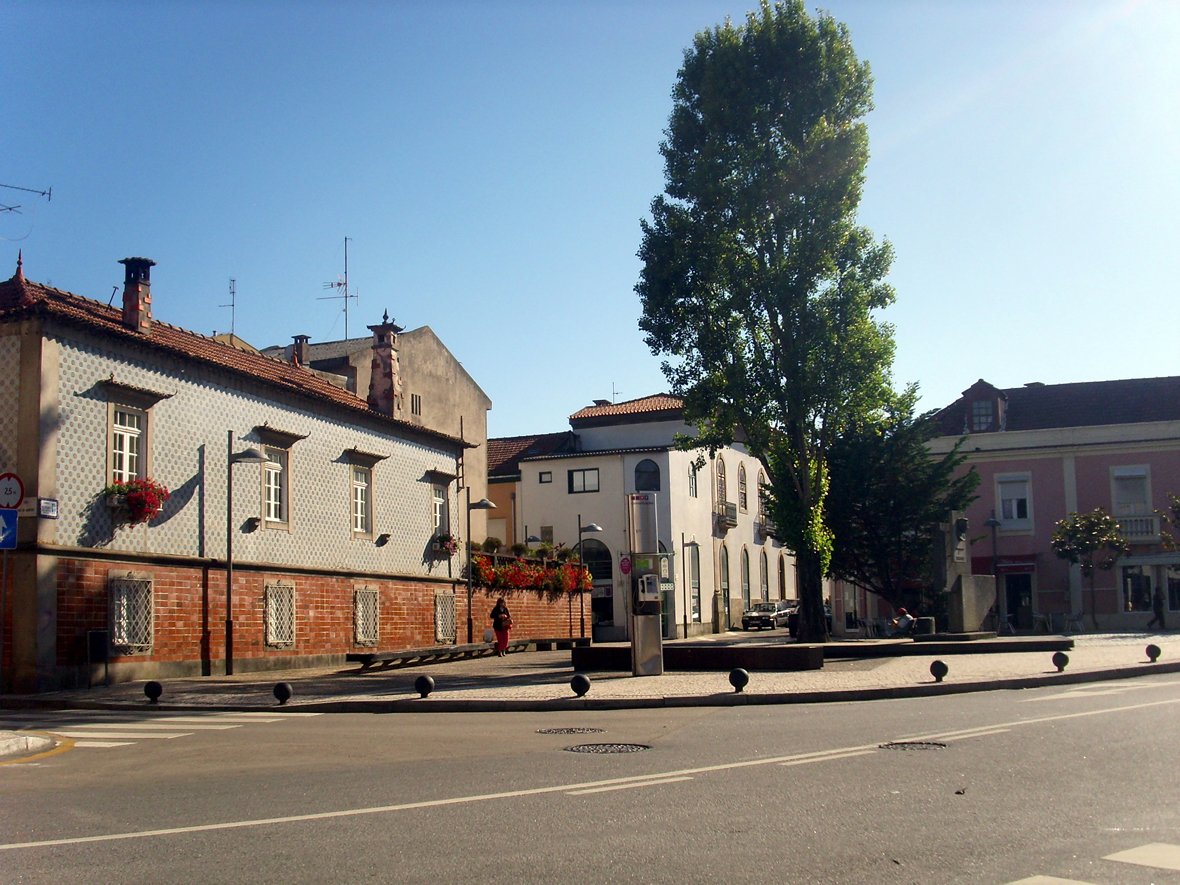
Elísio da Nova Square.

The district borders Póvoa de Varzim City Center to the north, to the East Matriz/Mariadeira, and to the South, the city of Vila do Conde.

== Festivals ==
The main district festivals are the Feast of the Assumption, one of the largest of this kind in Portugal, the pinnacle of the procession occurs in front of Póvoa's seaport, where fireworks are launched from carefully arranged boats and Bairro Sul's Saint Peter festival.
