= Bairro da Matriz =

Coordinates: 41.3896421°N 8.766605°W

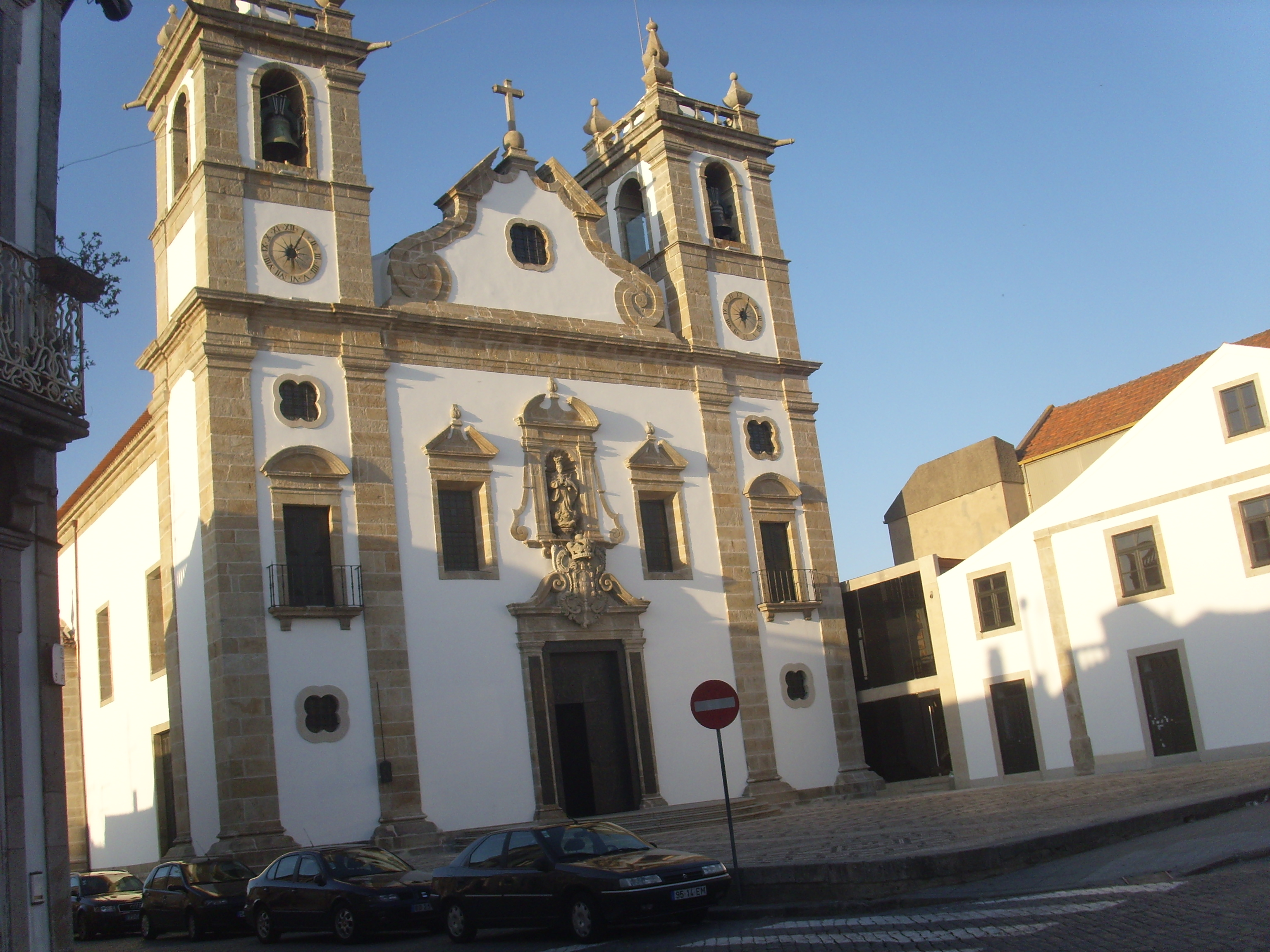
The First church of Póvoa de Varzim in the Praça Velha.

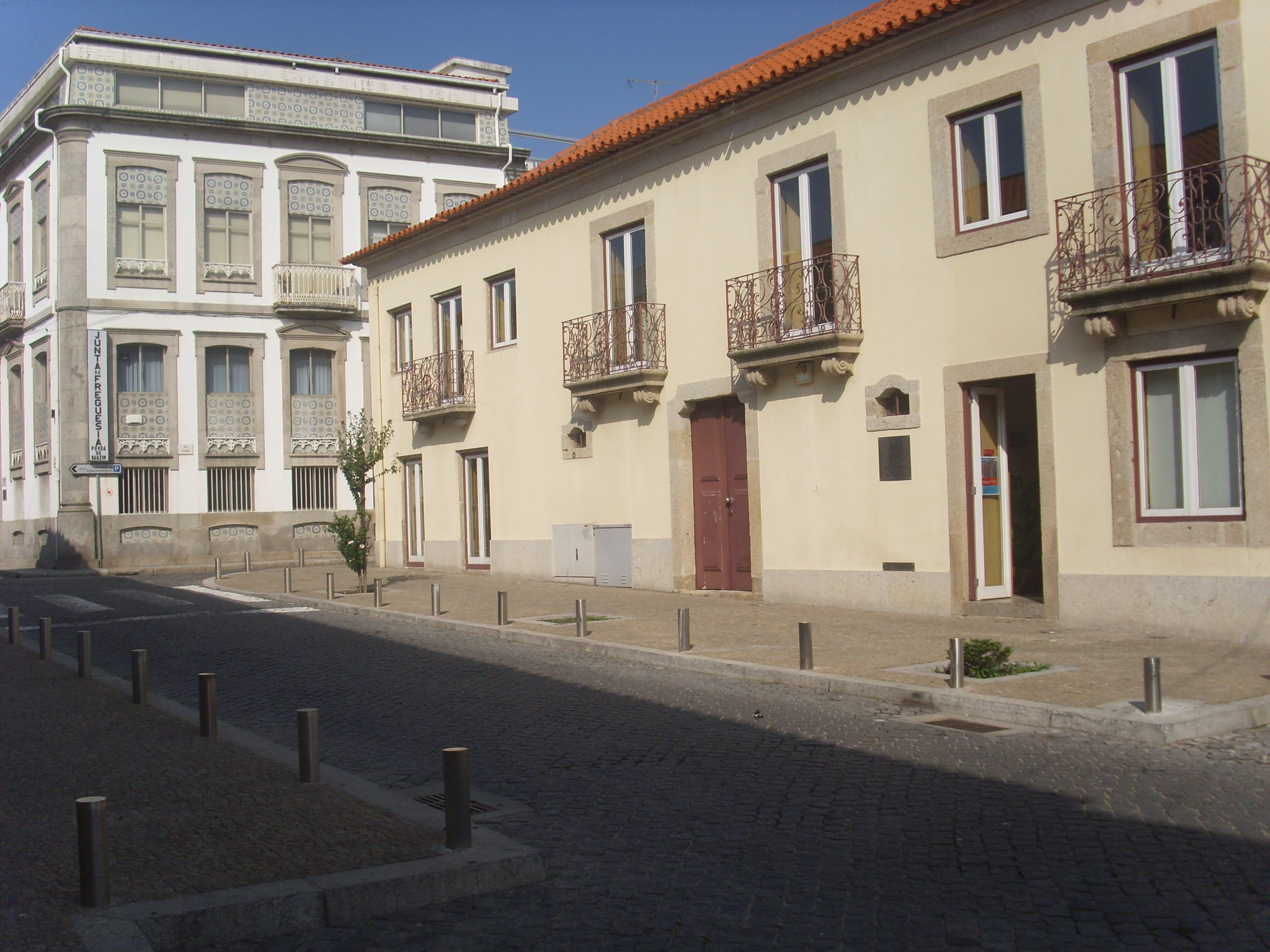
Visconde de Azevedo Street.

Bairro da Matriz (In Portuguese it means Mother/First Church Quarter) is the historical neighbourhood of the Portuguese city of Póvoa de Varzim and part of the Matriz/Mariadeira district.

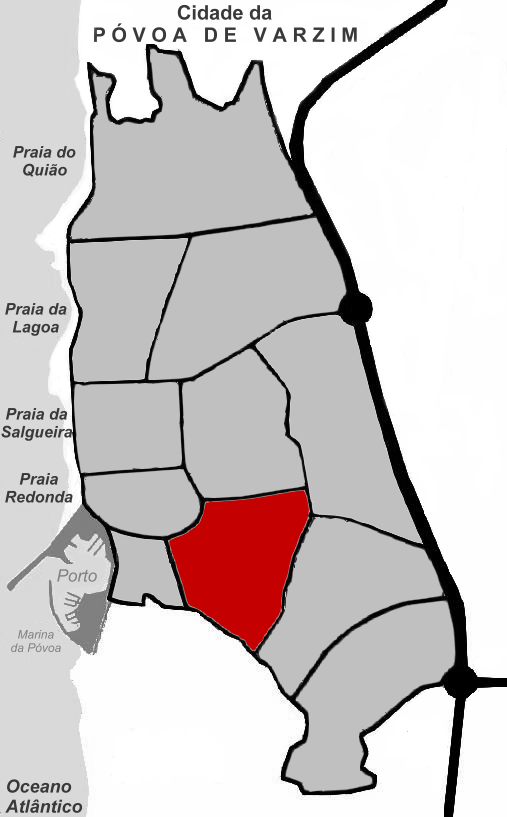
Matriz/Mariadeira district in the city of Póvoa de Varzim.

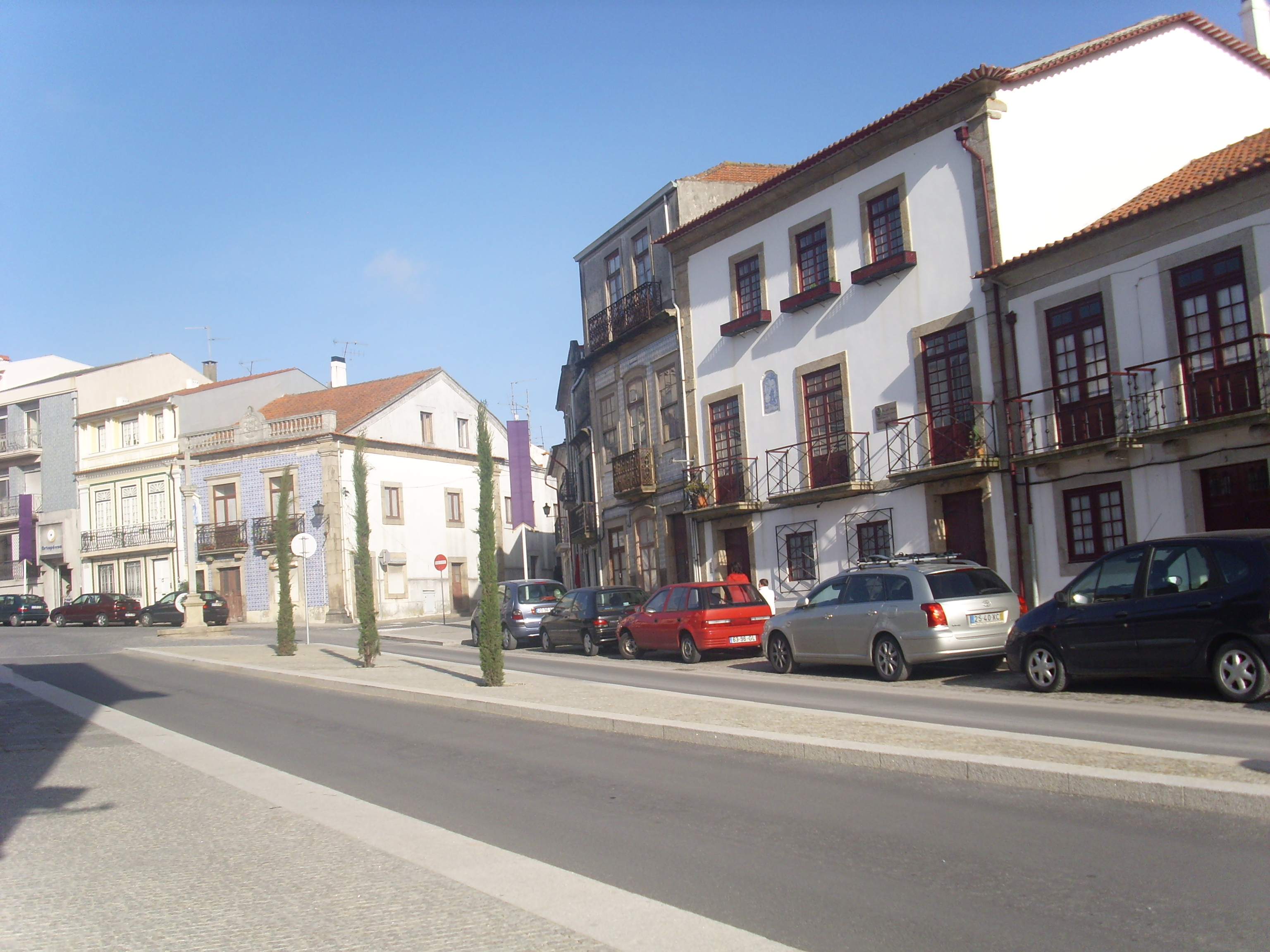
Eça de Queiroz Square.

Bairro da Matriz was a significant settlement in the 14th century, whose nucleus was the centre, whence the modern city grew, being a neighbourhood composed by old single family homes.

== History ==
In 1308, King Denis wrote a charter in which the King gave his royal land in Varzim to 54 local families; these would have to create a "Póvoa", a new settlement in Varzim, just south of the primitive Roman and Early Medieval core of the Town of Varzim, controlled by knights under a feudal structure. Praça Velha, the new civic center appears in this context, in the site of the "Póvoa Nova de Varzim" (The New Settlement of Varzim), which included the free fair, the town hall and a new church - the Madre Deus Church.

On February 18, 1743, the new First Church of Póvoa de Varzim started to be constructed near the town hall. By the end of the 18th century, it was noticeable that the Town Hall and the square were too small for an expanding urbanity, and the Royal Provision in 1791, created the Praça Nova (the New Square) where the new Town Hall was built.

== Festivals ==
The main festivals of the neighbourhood are the Saint Anthony on June 13 in Cidral Square; Matriz's Saint Peter on June 29, Senhor do Bonfim in Nova Sintra area, and the Senhora das Dores festival on September 15.
