= Architecture of Póvoa de Varzim =

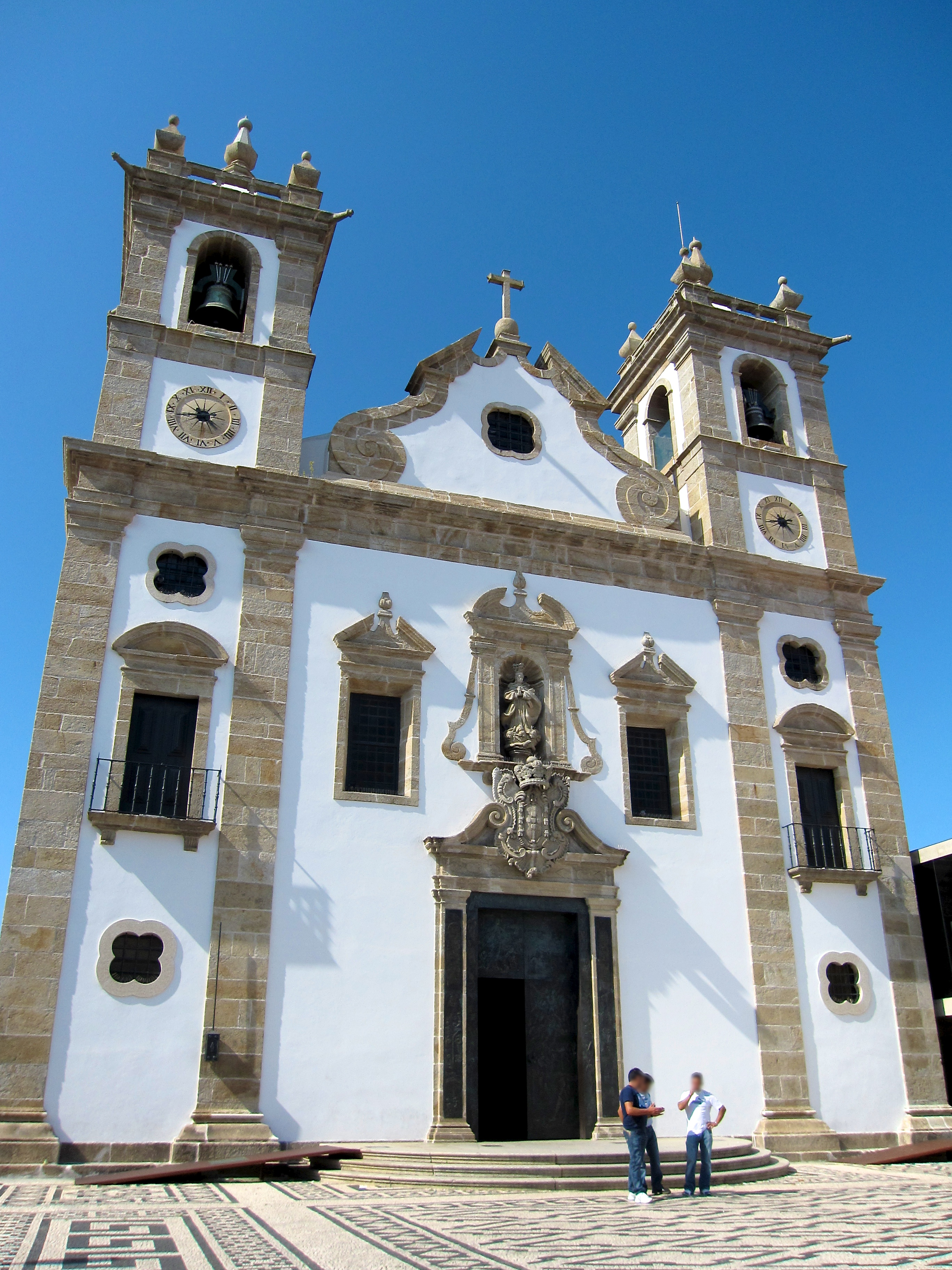
Portuguese Baroque and Rococo in the Matriz Church of Póvoa de Varzim.

The architecture of Póvoa de Varzim, in Portugal, demonstrates a broad variety of architectural styles over its thousand years of history. 11th-century Romanesque, 16th-century Mannerism, 18th-century Baroque, late 18th-century neoclassicism, early 20th-century Portuguese modernism and late 20th- to early 21st-century contemporary architectural styles and more are all represented in Póvoa de Varzim. As a whole it represents a rich eclectic tradition and innovation shaped by the people, their beliefs and economy.

== Castro ==
In the period of the Castro culture, stonework appeared in the 5th century BC in early huts, which existed beginning in 800 or 900 BC in Cividade de Terroso, the main local settlement, and gave way to granite-built family units with multiple houses surrounding a central paved yard. The family compound included a kitchen, warehouse, sleeping areas, a barn, meeting places and even funerary sites, where the ashes of the deceased were deposited.

One characteristic product was Pedras formosas, Portuguese for "beauty stones". These were elaborated and sculpted slabs used as door frames for the inner room, but none can currently be seen in Cividade de Terroso. Another characteristic element of Castro culture was warrior statues, representations of the leaders and glorification of the ancestors, which evolved from the stele statues of the Bronze Age and later became associated with Mediterranean and Celtic elements. The Castro jewelry had Celtic style, but the female jewelry found in Póvoa de Varzim also shows Mediterranean influence due to trade relations with the Carthaginians.

Buildings are typically circular, with diameters of between 4 and 5 meters and with walls 30 to 40 cm thick. The granite rocks were split and placed in two lines, with the smoother side on the outside and the inside of the house.

Castro architecture
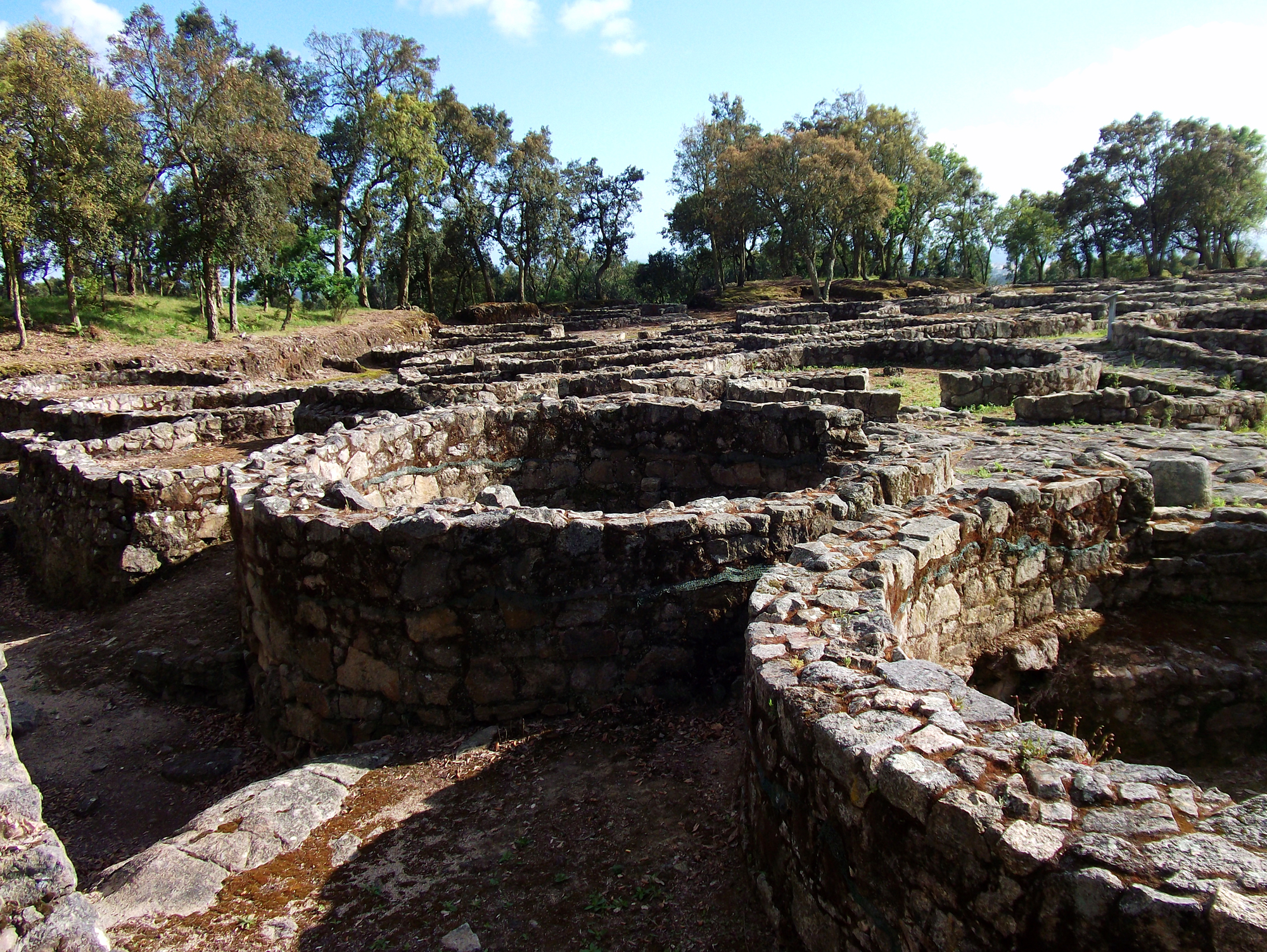
Castro housing in Cividade de Terroso

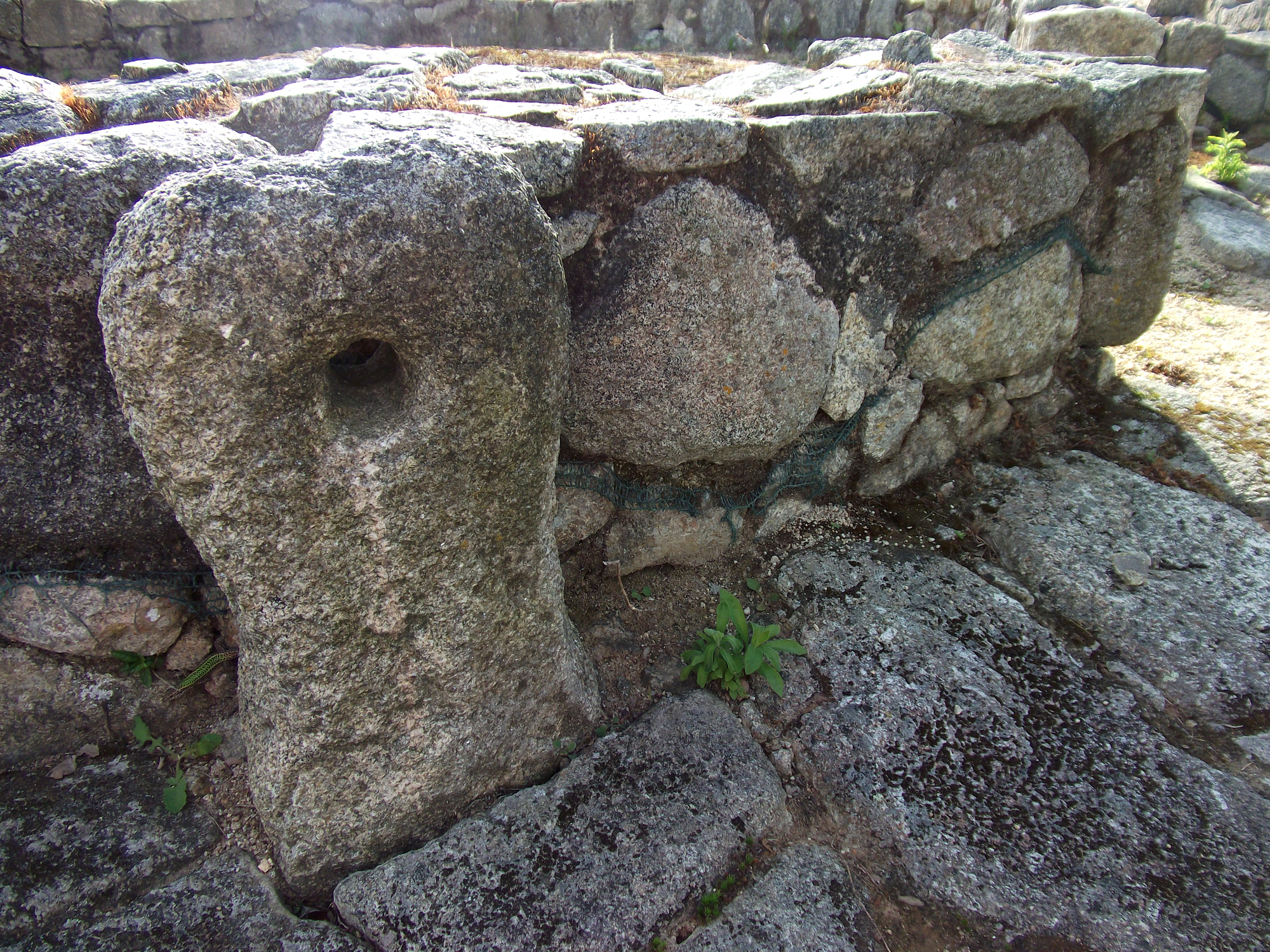
Utility stone near the front door

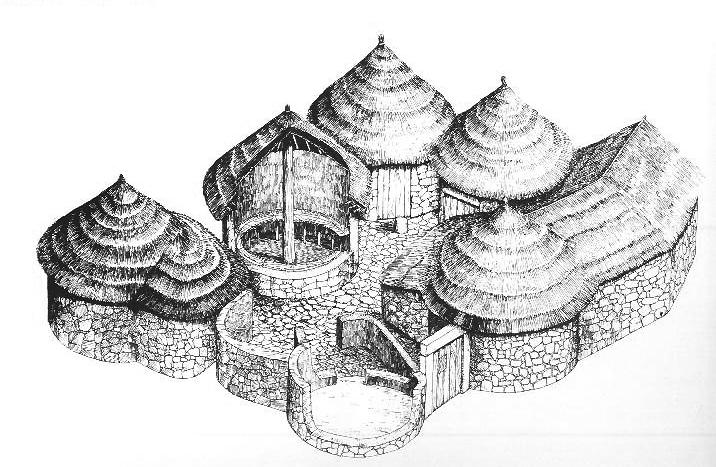
A typical family unit from Cividade de Terroso

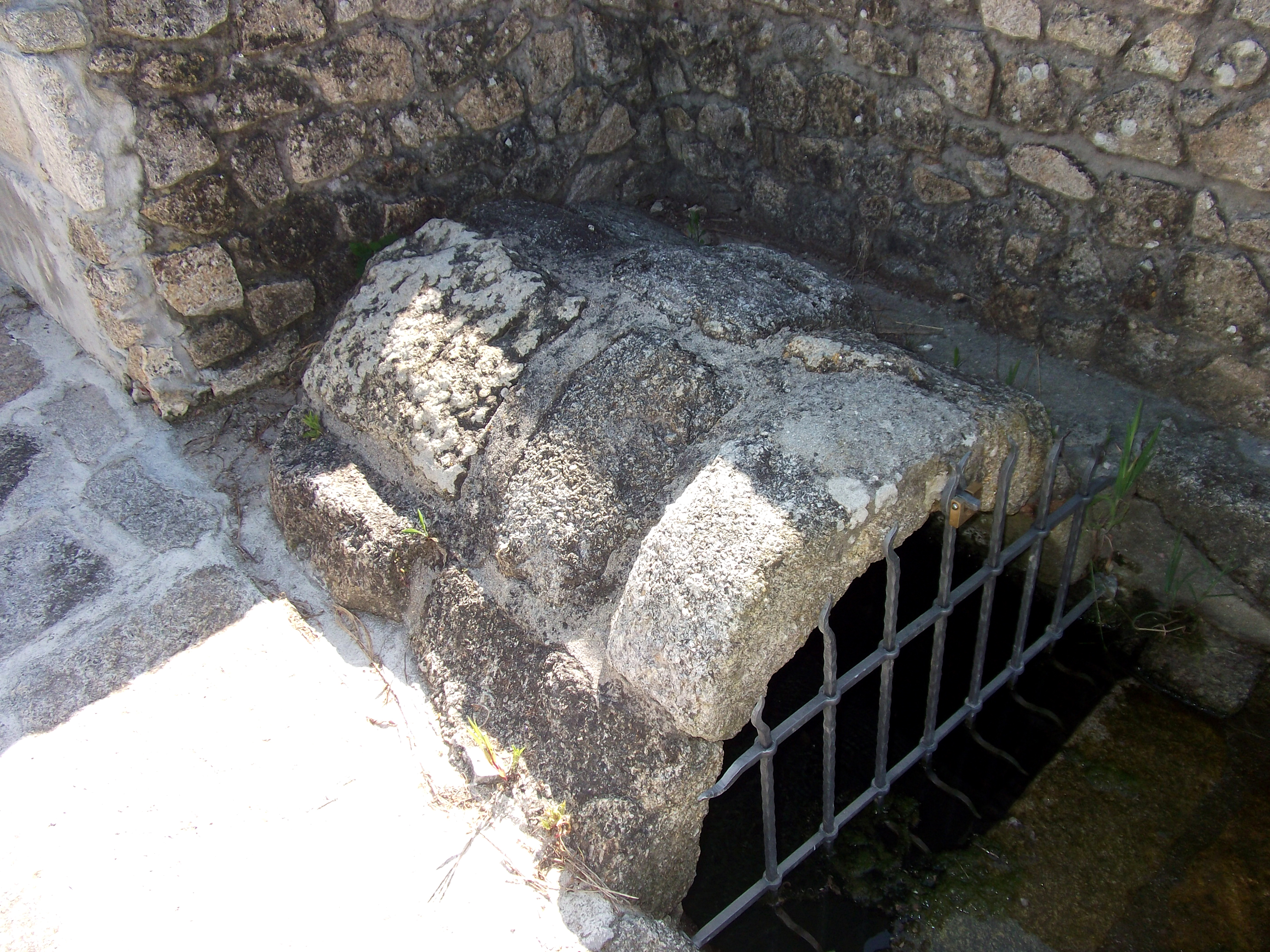
Romanized "Crasto" or Moura Fountain.

== Preromanesque and Romanesque ==
In the region, the São Pedro de Rates monastery church (rebuilding efforts began in 1096) is one of the oldest and best preserved Romanesque sites in Portugal. The church also shows elements from the Pre-romanesque and Roman periods.

An early construction phase between the late 9th century and early 10th century is known due to numerous fragments, namely mullions, a capital with foliage, and an altar decorated with a cross. The probable Pre-Romanesque narthex was discovered in recent archaeological surveys in an area of the building where a Roman stele was also found, which was later Christianized in the 6th-7th century, and reused in the Pre-Romanesque period.

Rates is one of the fundamental works of the first Portuguese Romanesque, and the project was modified several times during the 12th century, when the proper Romanesque architecture of the building was established. The relevance of its architecture and sculptures with diverse architectural influences makes this church a case study that is reflected in the production of further Romanesque art of the nascent kingdom of Portugal.

Closer to the city and in the vicinity of Rates, the Rio Mau São Cristóvão Church (rebuilt in 1151) is another well preserved Romanesque basilica, the remains of a medieval monastery that already existed in 1103. It is known for its northern dragon and griffin portal and capitals with anthropomorphic figures and strange boats that appear to be Norman boats, which have been used for the study of local ethnography and history. The iconography of the capitals and the representations on the tympanums of the three portals are major monuments of Portuguese art in the 12th and early 13th centuries. This small church is one of the most debated Romanesque works in Portugal, due to the quality of its sculptures.

Several elements in the old Church of Amorim, such as some of the corbels and a richly decorated capital, taken to the Soares dos Reis Museum in Porto in early 20th century, suggest it is an earlier Romanesque basilica. The capital is sculpted with episodes from the Chanson de Roland, depicting the Battle of Roncesvalles, in which Roland with his sword Durandal attacks and arrests Chernuble, anthropomorphic figures playing the horn Olifant, and Olivier, who fell in combat.

Romanesque architecture
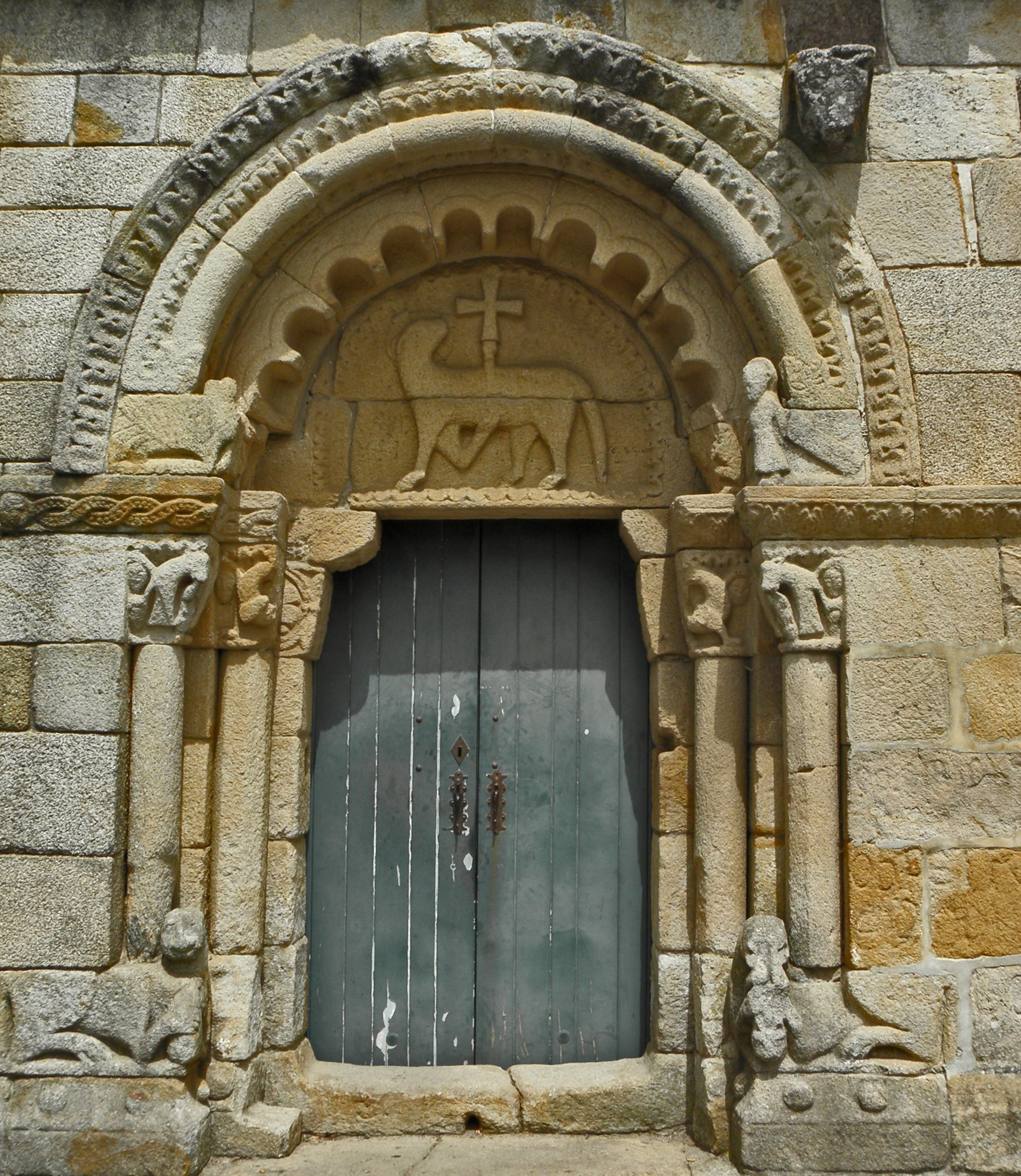
Anthropomorphic and zoomorphic south portal of Rates Church

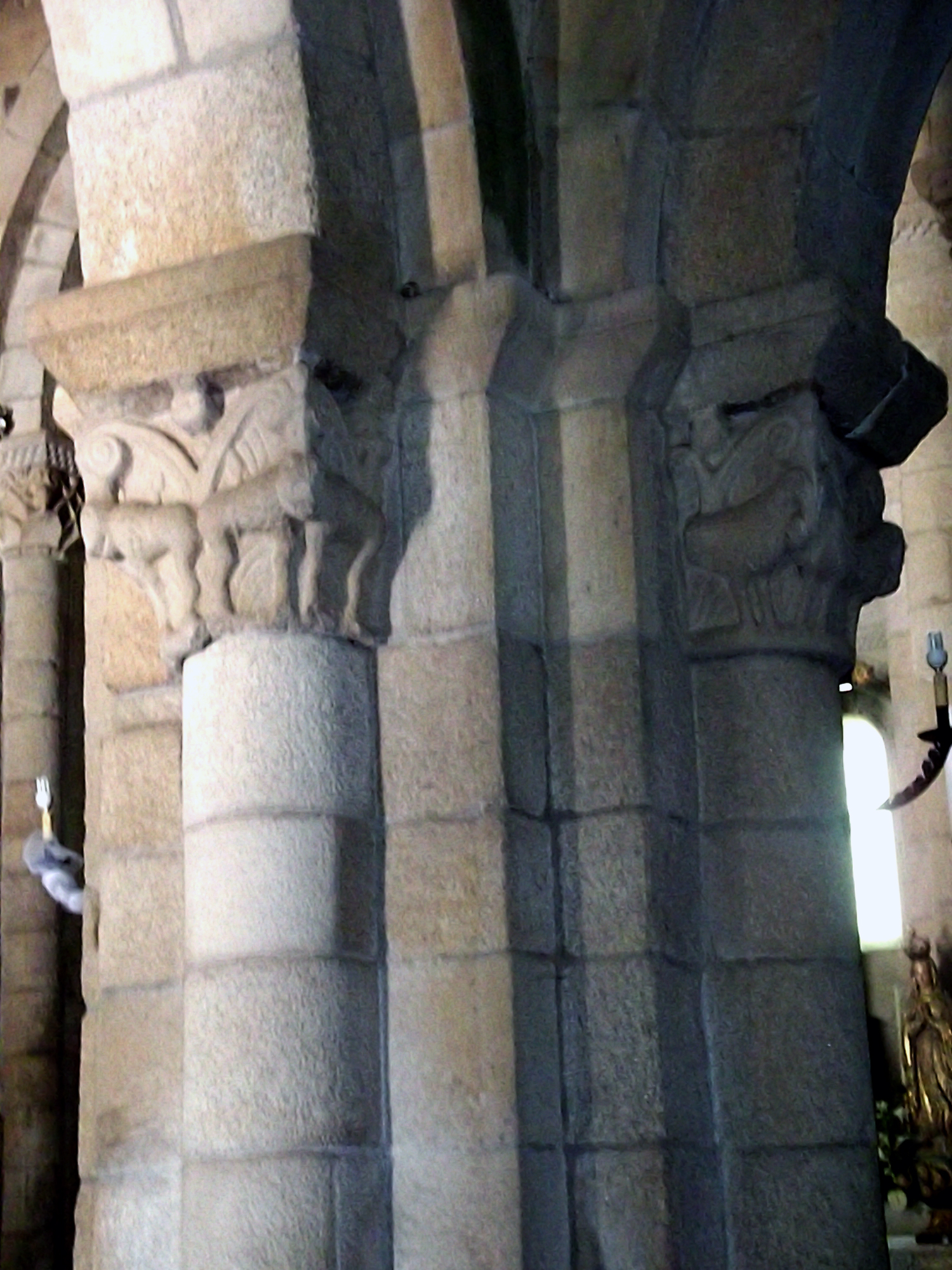
Capitals in the Romanesque Church of Rates

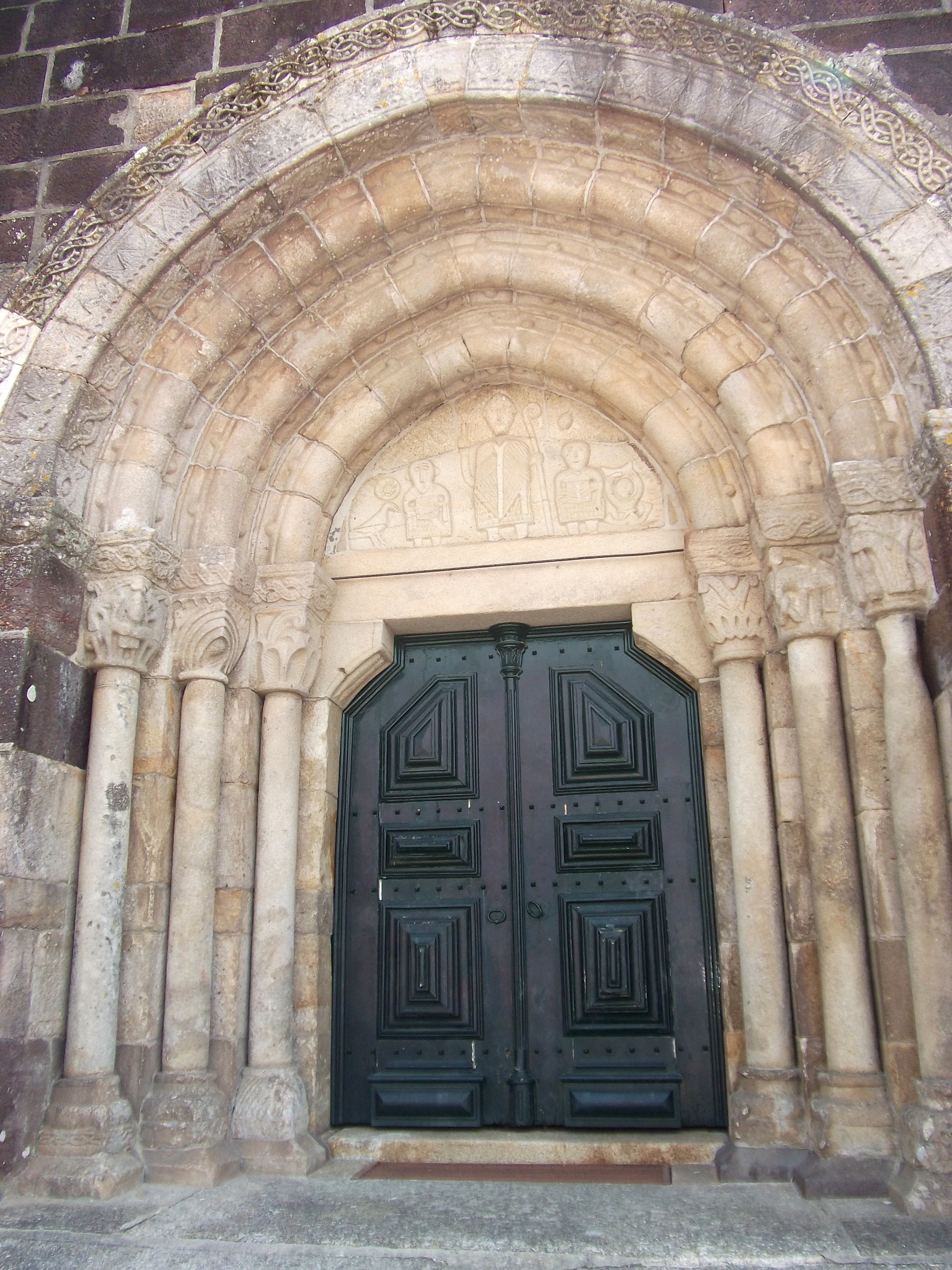
Main portal of Rio Mau Church

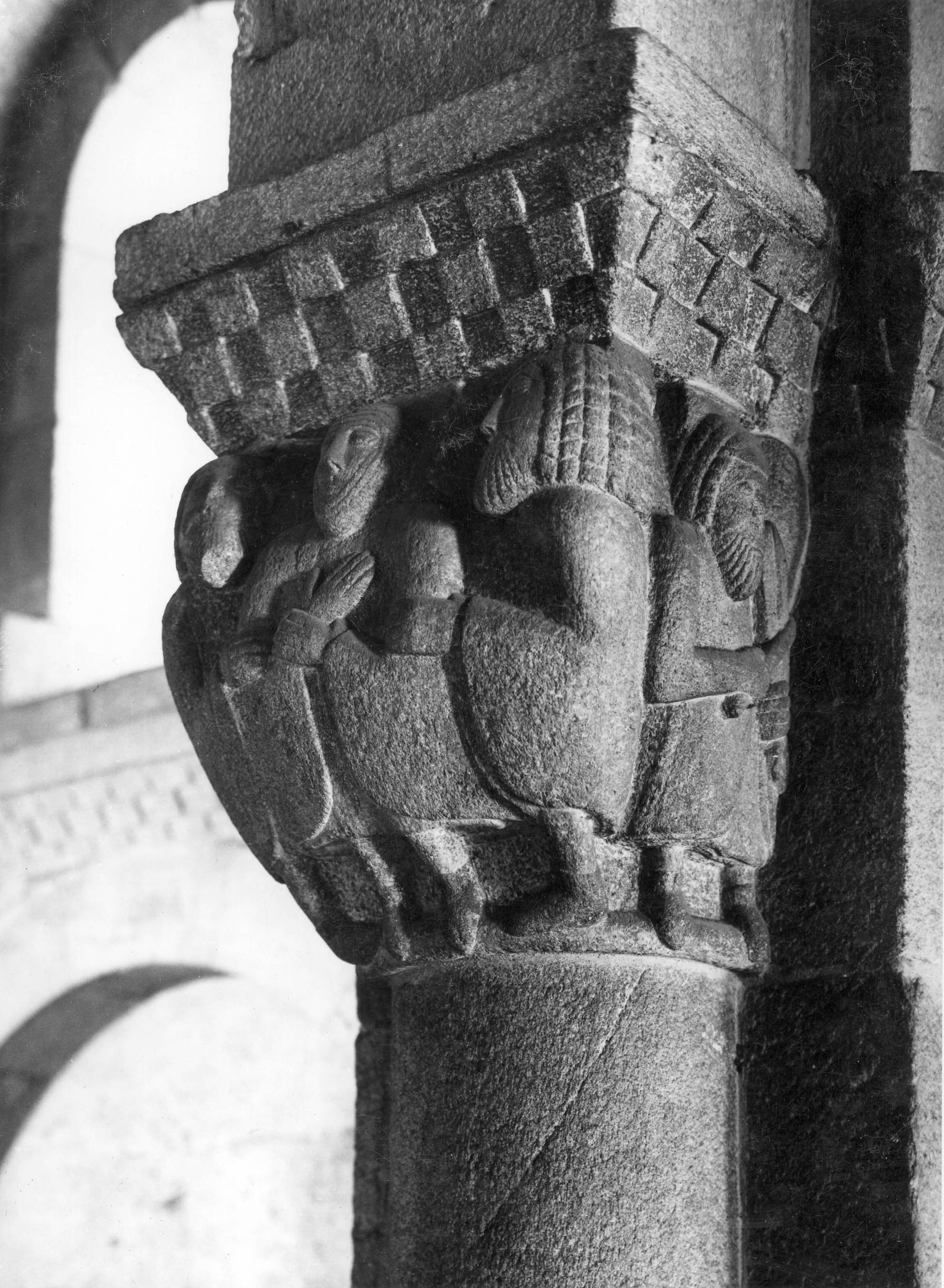
Anthropomorphic capital in Rio Mau Church

== Gothic ==
The old main church of Póvoa de Varzim, in Largo das Dores, had indications of Romanesque architecture, such as the snake over the main portal that gave rise to the local legend of the Great Snake, although the portal that survived into the modern period also had Gothic elements. This Gothic design was also present in the icons from the old main church, such as the icon of Our Lady of Varzim (13th century) and those of Saint James and Saint Elmo, both possibly from the 14th century.

Locally, Gothic is best preserved in Vila do Conde. The Church of Santa Clara dates to 1318, the year when the ecclesiastical domain over Póvoa de Varzim began and is fundamental to Portuguese Gothic architecture north of the Douro River. The overlordship of the Monastery of Santa Clara lasted until the reign of King Manuel I. In the vicinity of Santa Clara Church, the present-day monastic building is a neoclassical construction, built in 1777 by architect Henrique Ventura Lobo.

The Main Church of Vila do Conde (construction began in 1496) was financed by Manuel I and has on its Late Gothic façade one of the earliest known representations of the coat-of-arms of Póvoa de Varzim. The portal is the work of architect João de Castilho.

Gothic architecture
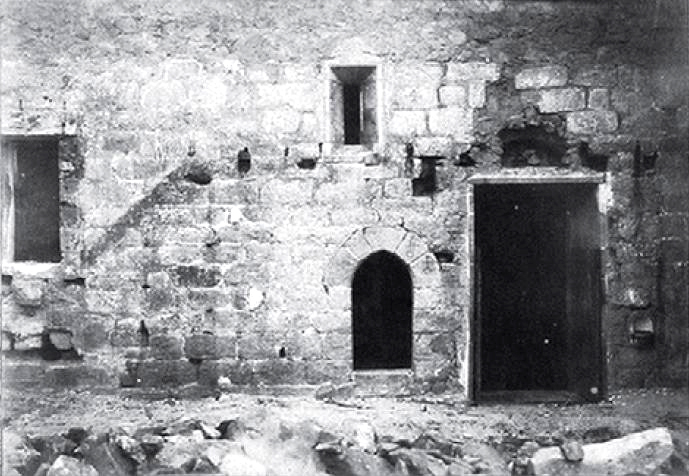
The first church of Póvoa de Varzim being demolished in January 1910; it then became clear it had a Romano-Gothic foundation

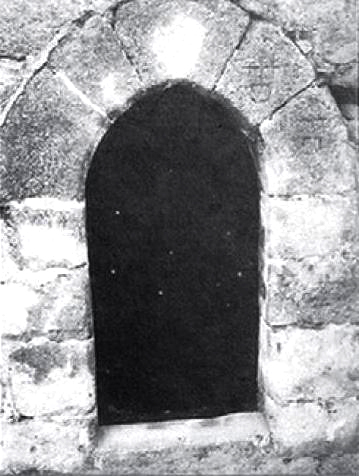
Signed Romano-Gothic arch, currently preserved in the city's museum

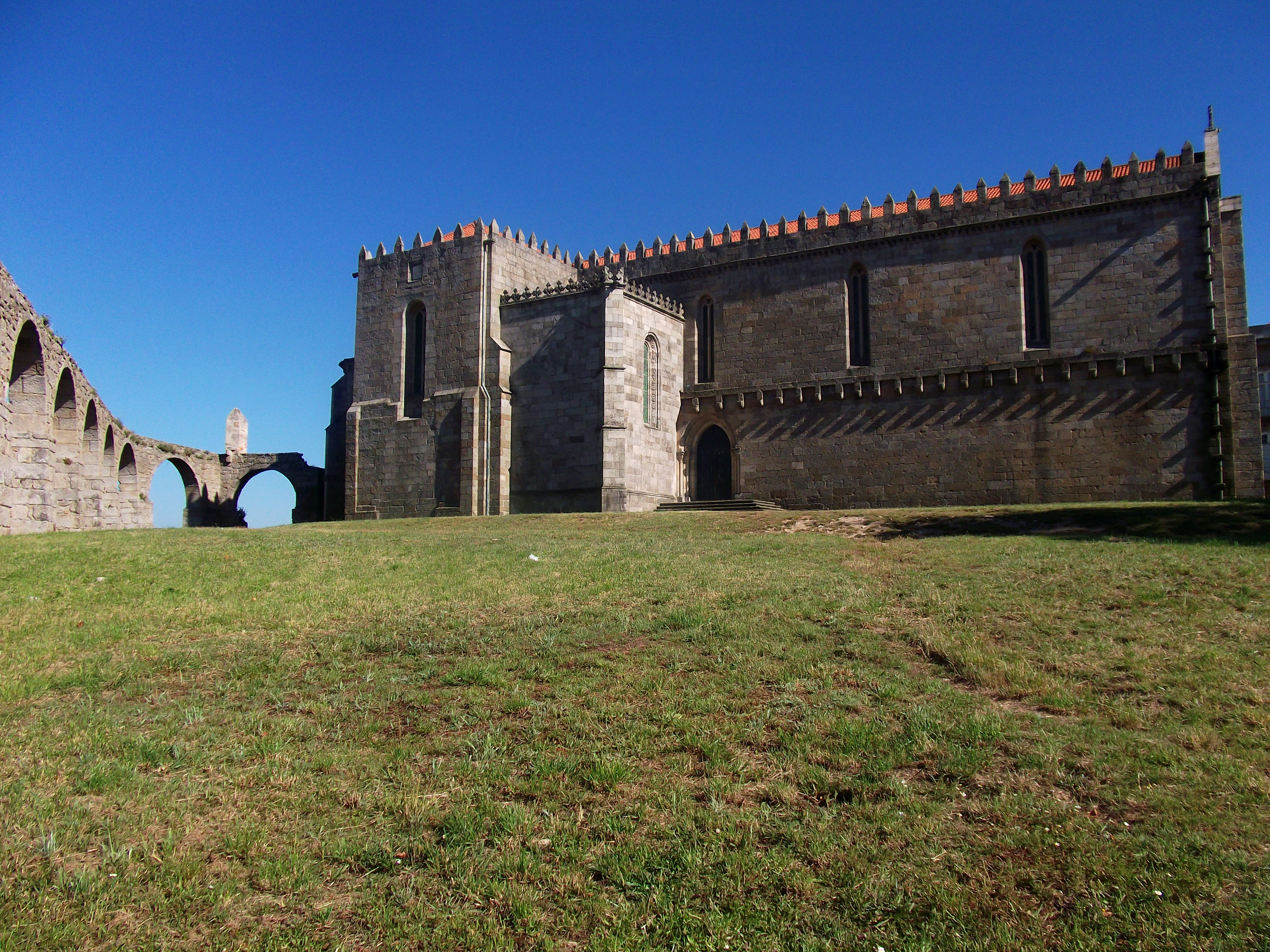
Santa Clara Church in Vila do Conde and the endpoint of the Aqueduct of Santa Clara

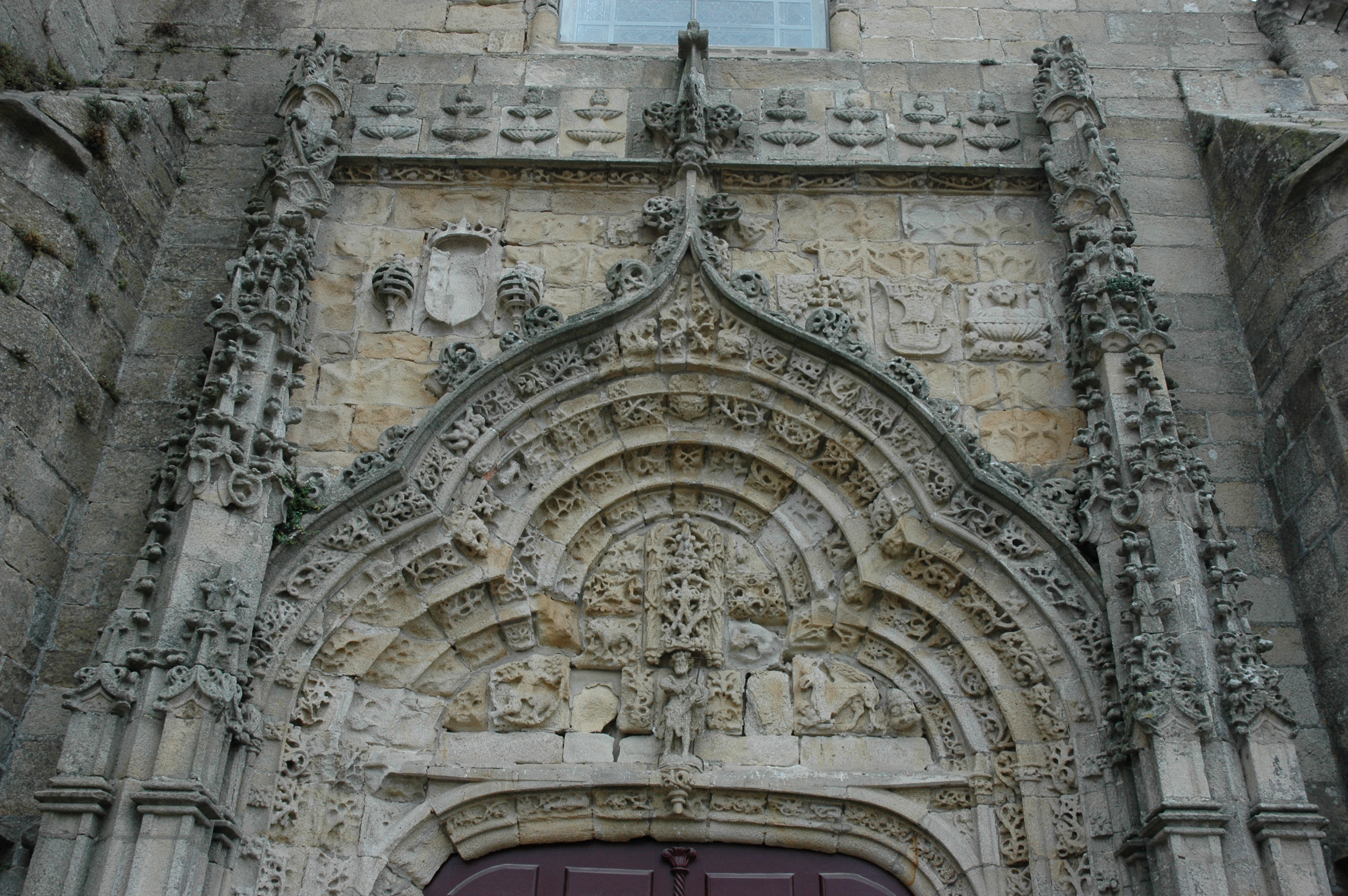
Late Gothic portal of the main church of Vila do Conde

== Mannerism and Plain architecture ==
16th century Mannerism can be seen in Santo André Chapel, the Old Church of Santiago de Amorim and Laundos Church. The Old Santiago de Amorim Church, with three naves, was rebuilt in 1595 and most of the church is now in Mannerist style.

During the union of Portugal and Spain, the period between 1580 and 1640, a new style developed called Portuguese plain architecture. This style has a clear structure, a sturdy appearance with smooth, flat surfaces and a moderate arrangement of space, lacking excessive decorations, and is basically a form of mannerism.

Mannerism and Plain architecture
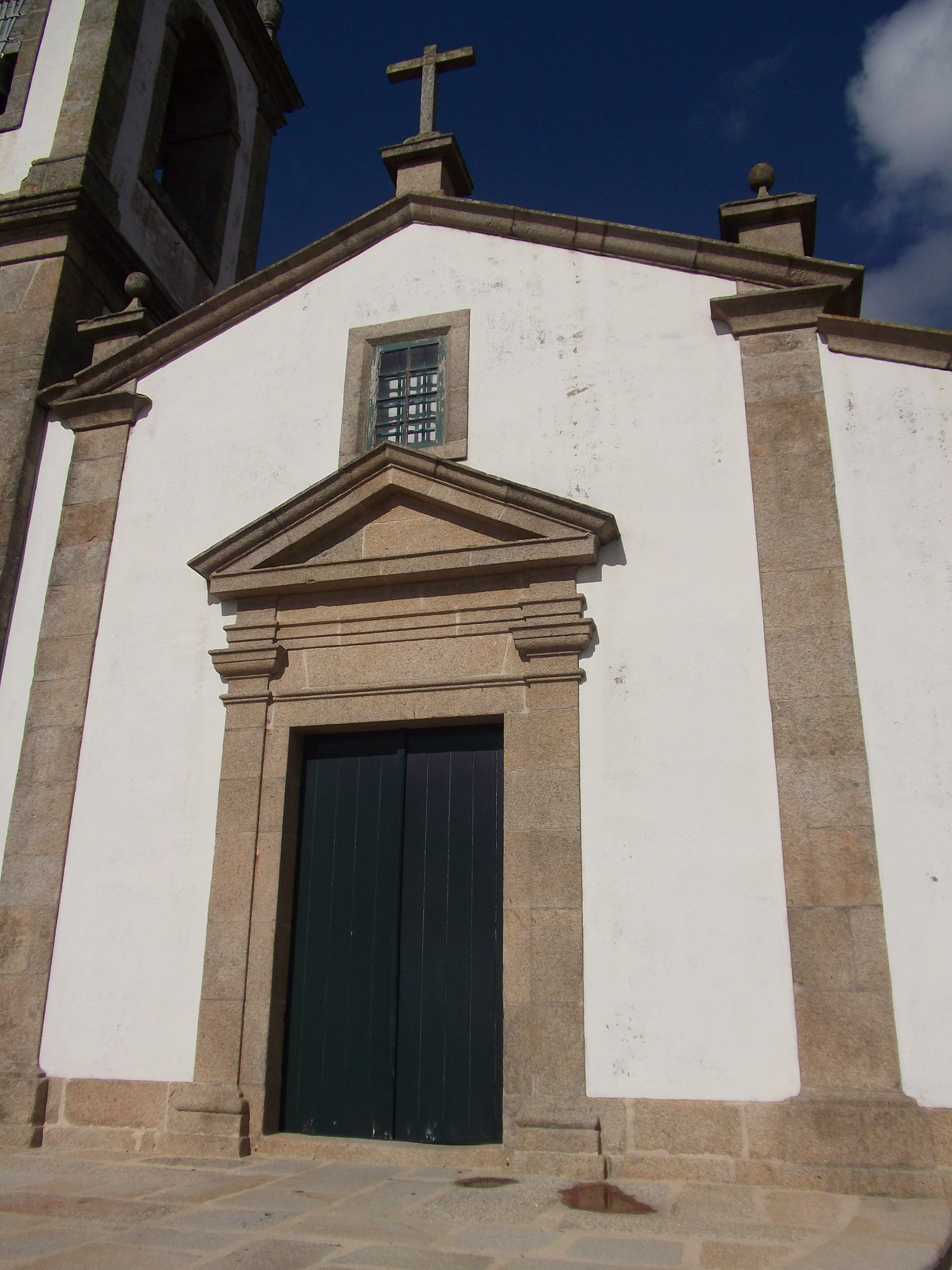
Main portal of the Old Parish Church of Amorim

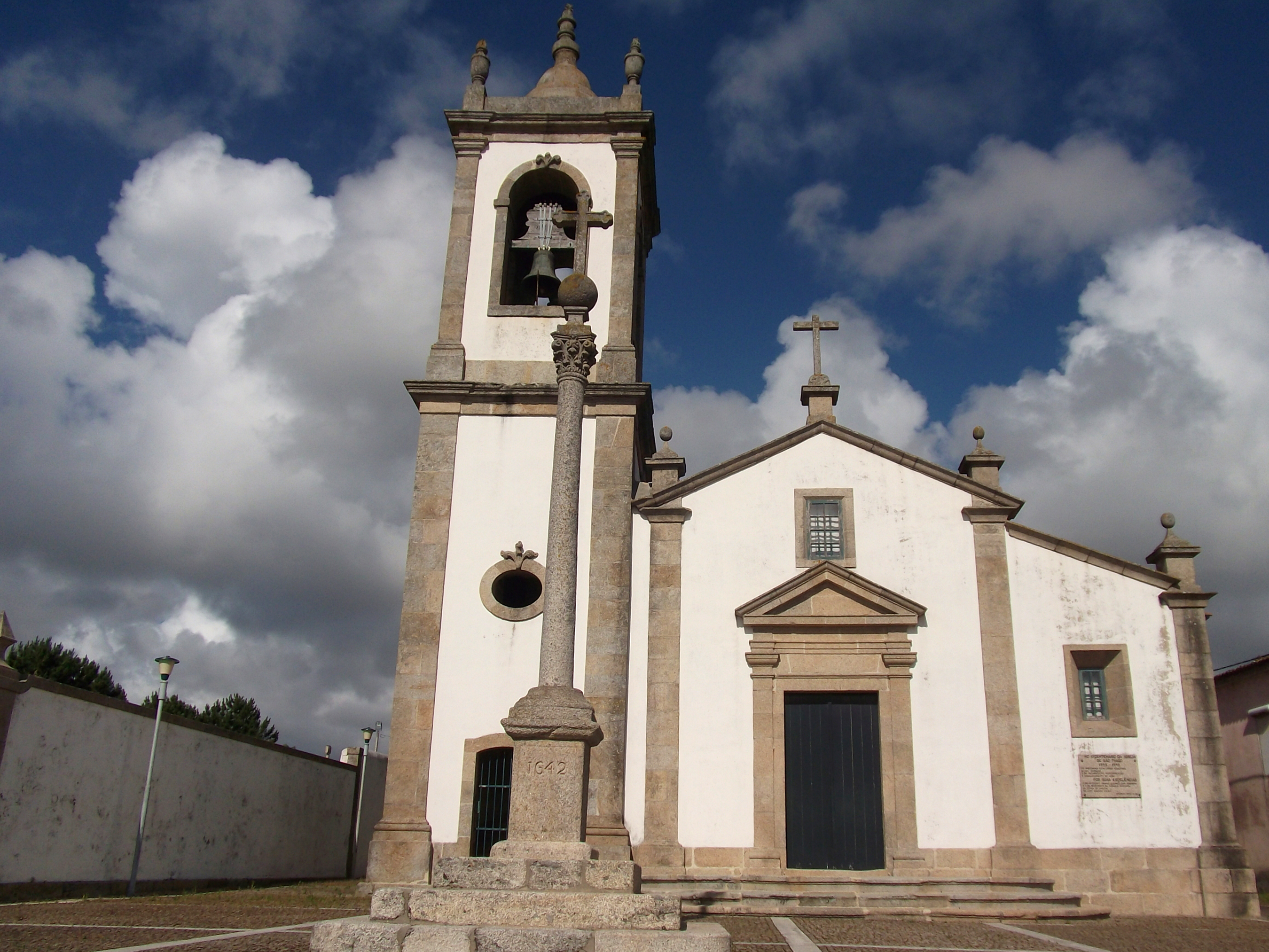
Old Parish Church of Amorim

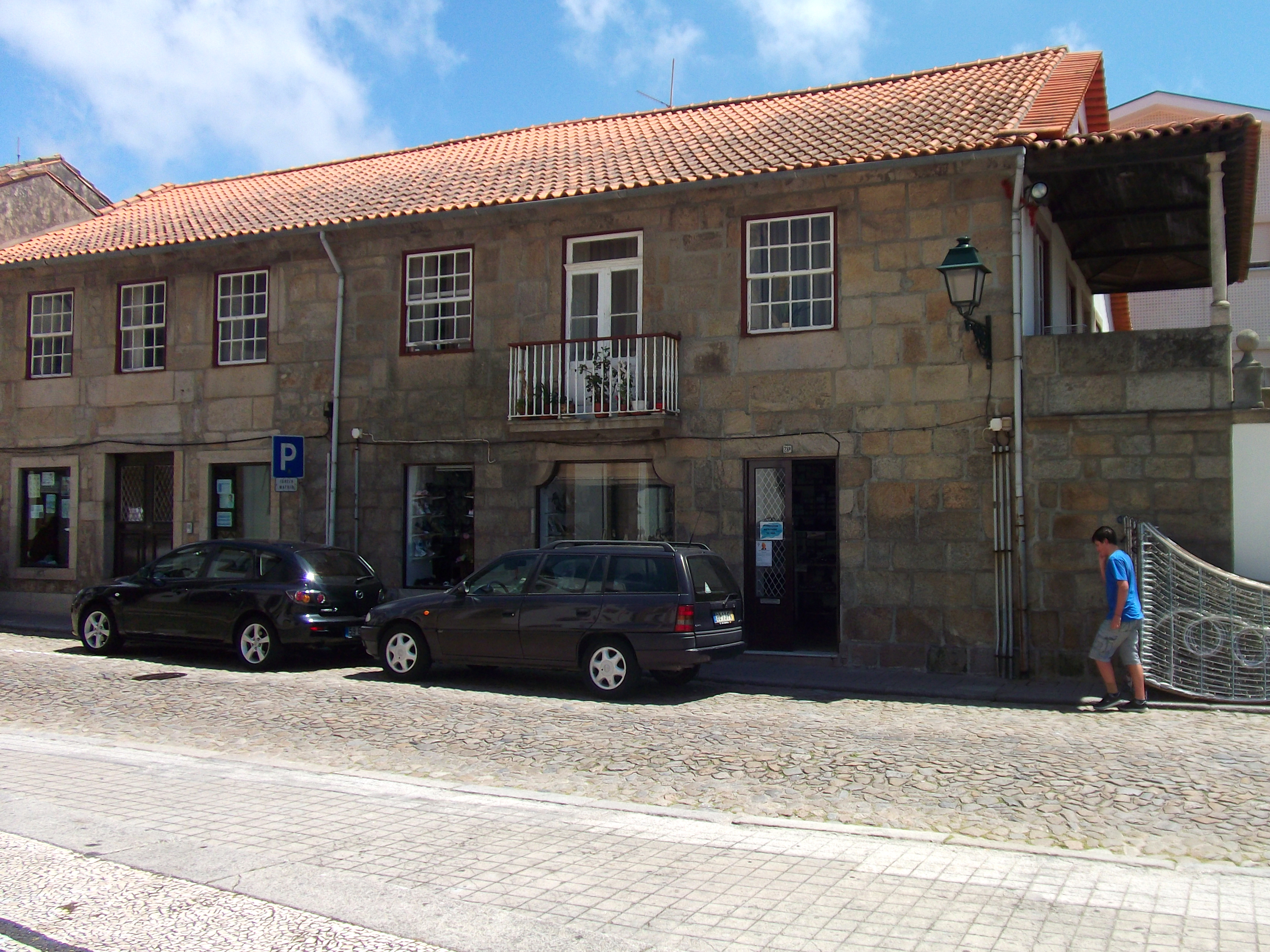
António Cardia House in Praça Velha

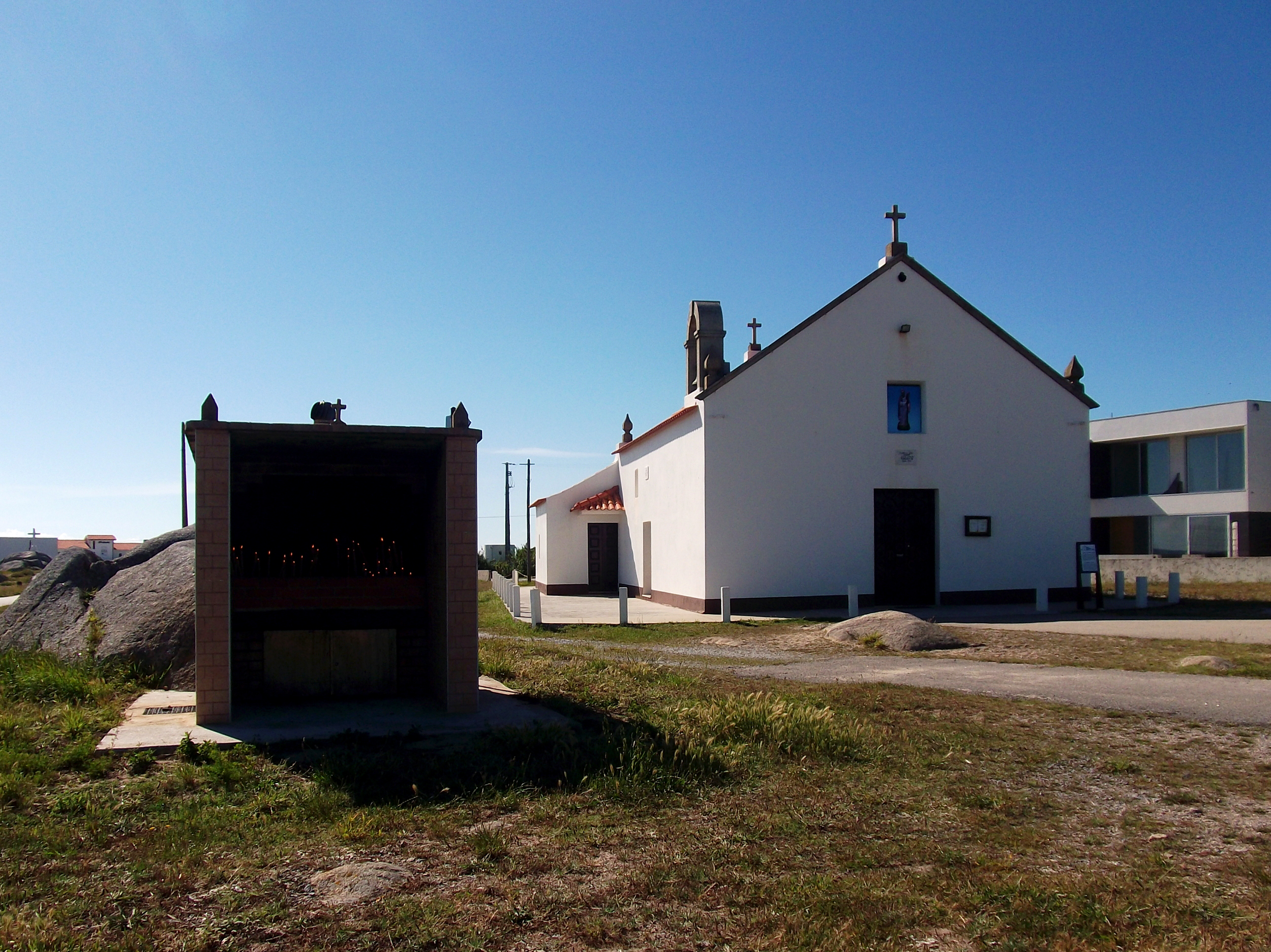
Santo André Chapel

== Baroque and Rococo ==
During the 18th century, Póvoa was prospering due to the golden age of fisheries and exuberant Baroque architecture is well represented in the Matriz Church of Póvoa de Varzim (the current main church of Póvoa de Varzim), Senhora das Dores Church, and the chapels of Castelo da Póvoa, Senhor da Praça de Rates and Santo António de Cadilhe. Solar dos Carneiros is probably a 17th-century urban nobleman's palace, rebuilt in the 18th century by Manuel Carneiro da Grã-Magriço, and since the 1930s has been the city's main museum. The edifice has a Baroque style with variable fenestration and an imposing blason in Rocaille style. Bordering the Matriz Church, the Captain leite Ferreira House is another nobleman's house built in the 18th century. Late Baroque, or Rococo, style is also visible in Solar dos Carneiros da Grã-Magriço house and chapel in the countryside.

Matriz Church of Póvoa de Varzim was designed by the notable 18th-century master stonemason and architect Fernandes da Silva of Braga (1693–1751). Póvoa de Varzim's Matriz church is one of his most famous projects. His finest works were all created after 1727, and Fernandes da Silva also started work on a new Baroque façade for Braga Cathedral and the construction of Congregados Church, also in Braga. Matriz is noted for a rich rococo altarpiece. The façade has the exuberant lines of Baroque art, with a trimmed gable where the portal is cut through, crowned by a royal blason, over which is a niche with a statue of the Virgin Mary sculpted in rock.

The interior of Matriz Church is a single wide nave covered by a barrel vault. The nave is strengthened by three robust toroidal arches and the walls are decorated with nine Joanino (King John's style) Baroque altars, in gilded woodcarving, featuring 18th-century sculptures. Its retables are notable, especially the one in the chancel, in Rococo style, made up of six composite order capital columns. The Rocaille woodcarvings were created in the beginning of the style in Entre-Douro-E-Minho, between 1755 and 1758, by André Ribeiro Soares da Silva (1720–1769).

Baroque and Rococo
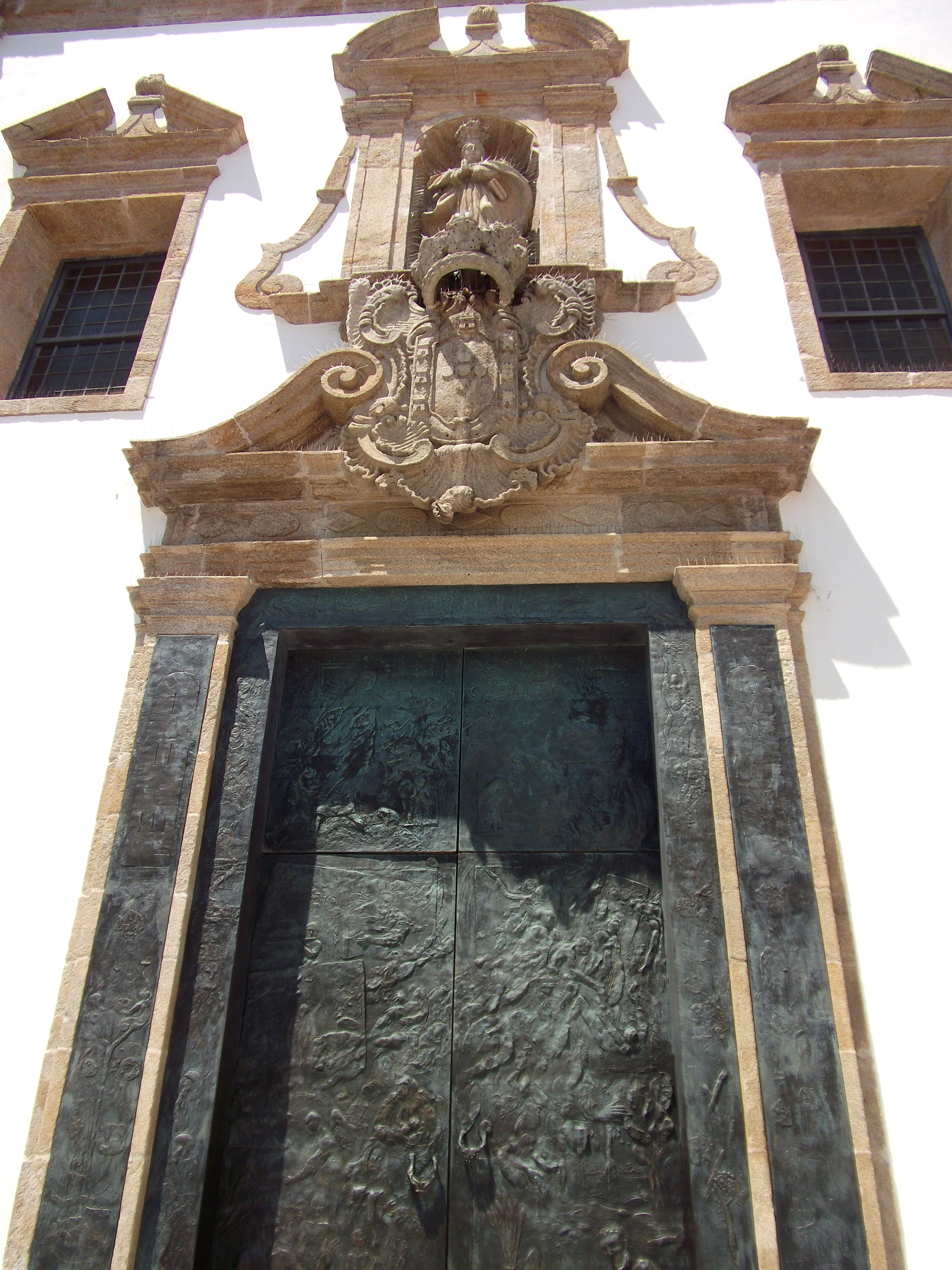
Rococo portal in Matriz Church

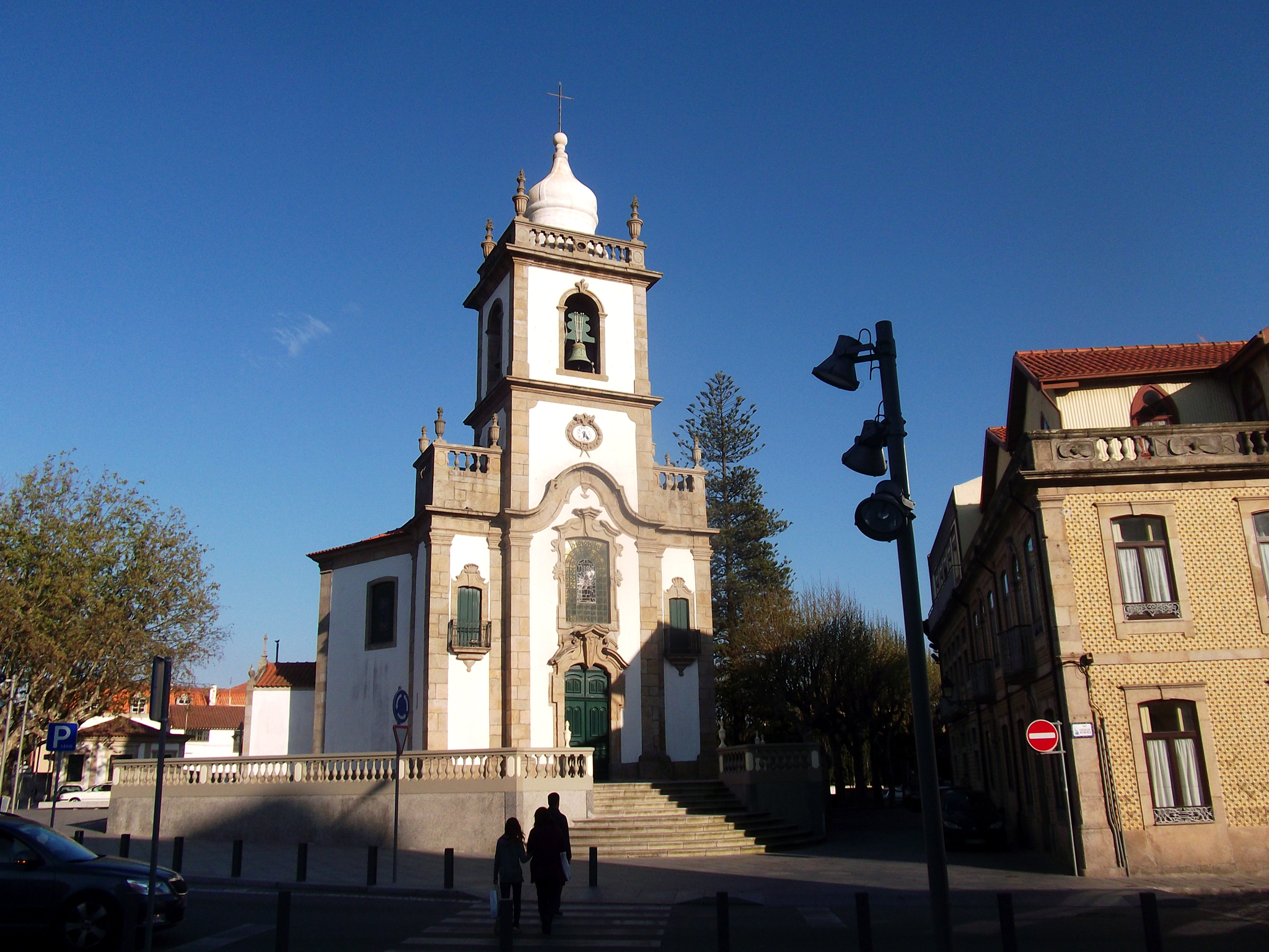
Senhora das Dores Church

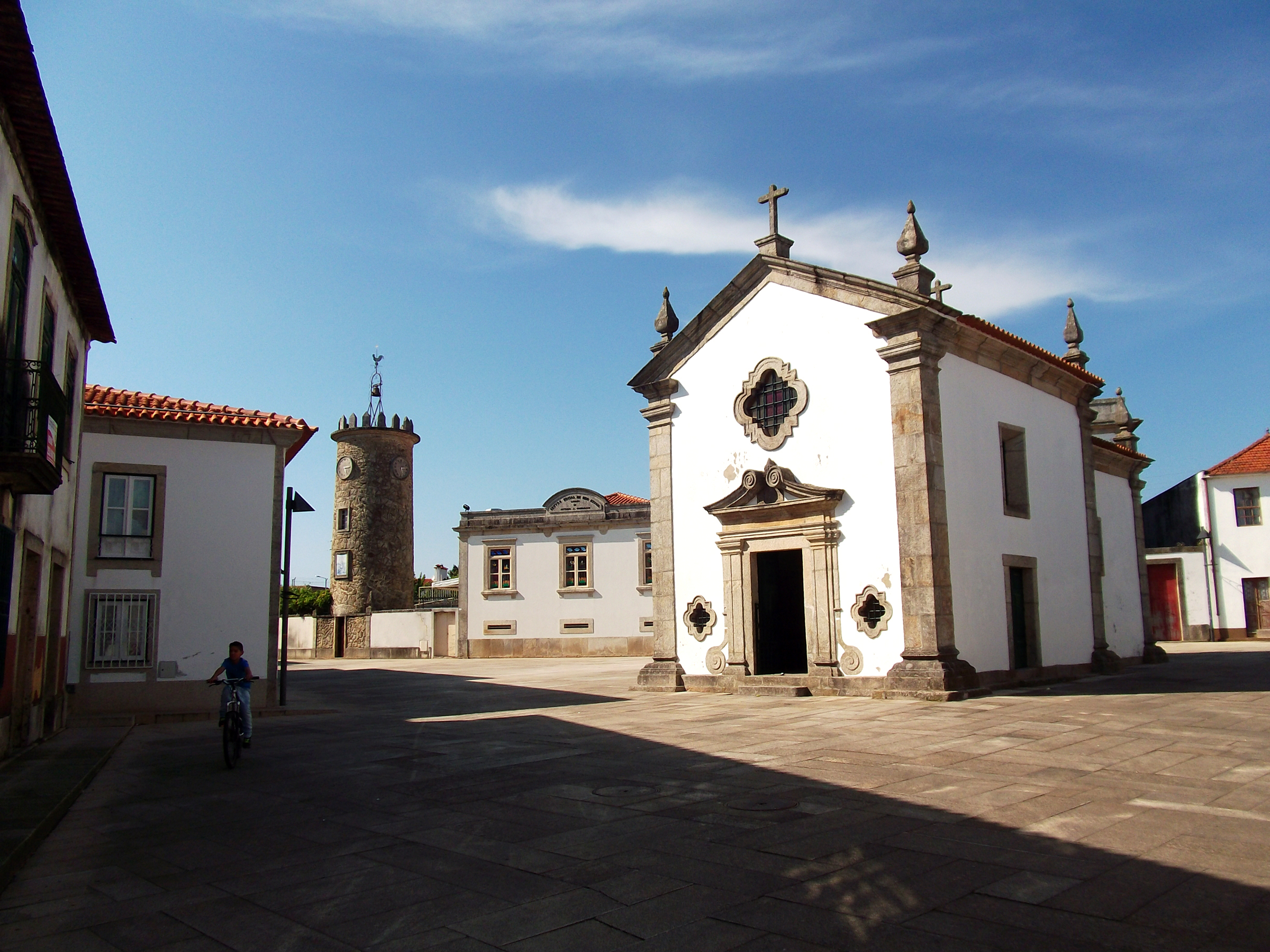
Rates Chapel

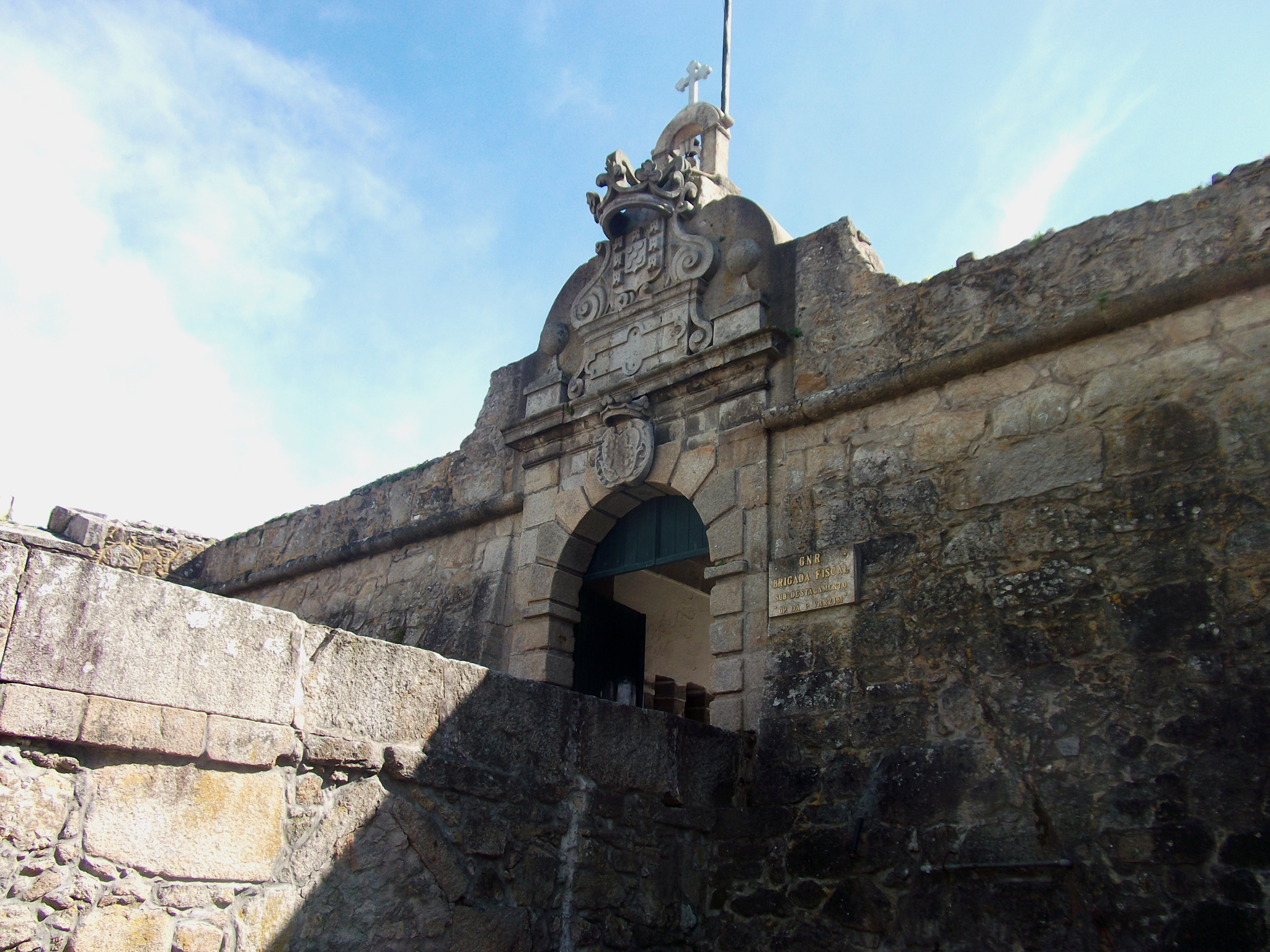
Gate of Póvoa Fortress

== Neoclassical, Eclecticism and Romanesque Revival ==
The early phase of the Neoclassical style (late 18th century) is well represented in Póvoa de Varzim in Póvoa de Varzim City Hall (1790). Designed by French engineer Reinald Oudinot, the building follows the neoclassical principles of late 18th-century urbanism. It has a solid and, in a certain way, archaic façade, with arch stonework on the ground floor reminiscent of the English feitoria in Porto. This architectural style was never widely adopted. The upper floor has rectangular windows over the axes of the ground floor arches, to which was added between 1908 and 1910 azulejo tile-work by the Belgian painter Joseph Bialman. Tile-work for decorating façades follows a local Portuguese taste that was popular in the 19th century and widespread in Póvoa de Varzim.

Eclecticism and Late neoclassical style can be found in the Jesuit church of Coração de Jesus Basilica (1890–1948) and Misericórdia Church of Póvoa de Varzim (1914). The latter also has Baroque elements and was built using an Eclectic ideology by architect Adães Bermudes. Misericórdia is a reconstruction of the early main church of Póvoa de Varzim (the former Santa Maria de Varzim church that later became known as Misericórdia Church) and some of the stonework used in the new building was obtained from the old church demolished on January 13, 1910. The neoclassical planning inside is a formalism taken to extremes by the revivalist architect.

The Basilica forms a Latin cross with three naves. Despite being a late construction, it retains the mannerist scheme typical of Jesuit art. However, the façade differs substantially and has a neoclassical style with Baroque-inspired cornices, and the towers recall Romanesque solutions. The dome is topped by a 5-ton statue of the Sacred Heart of Jesus. This Jesus icon, blessed in 1888 by Cardinal D. Américo, was the reason for the construction of the Basilica. The Romanesque Revival style can be seen in São José de Ribamar and Amorim churches, the latter of which was also designed by Adães Bermudes and inaugurated in 1922.

As ancient chapels were expanded since the middle of the 19th century and construction took place in different periods, eclecticism came naturally and is found in several churches of Póvoa de Varzim, both in the city and on its outskirts.

Neoclassical, Eclecticism and Neoromanesque
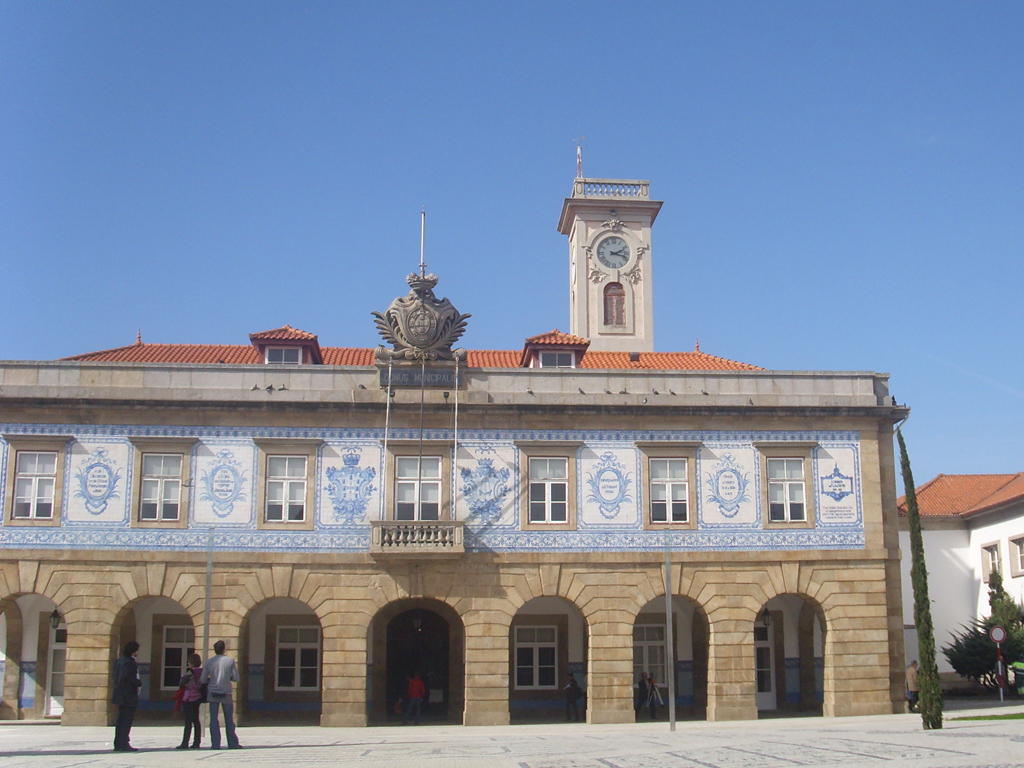
Póvoa de Varzim City Hall

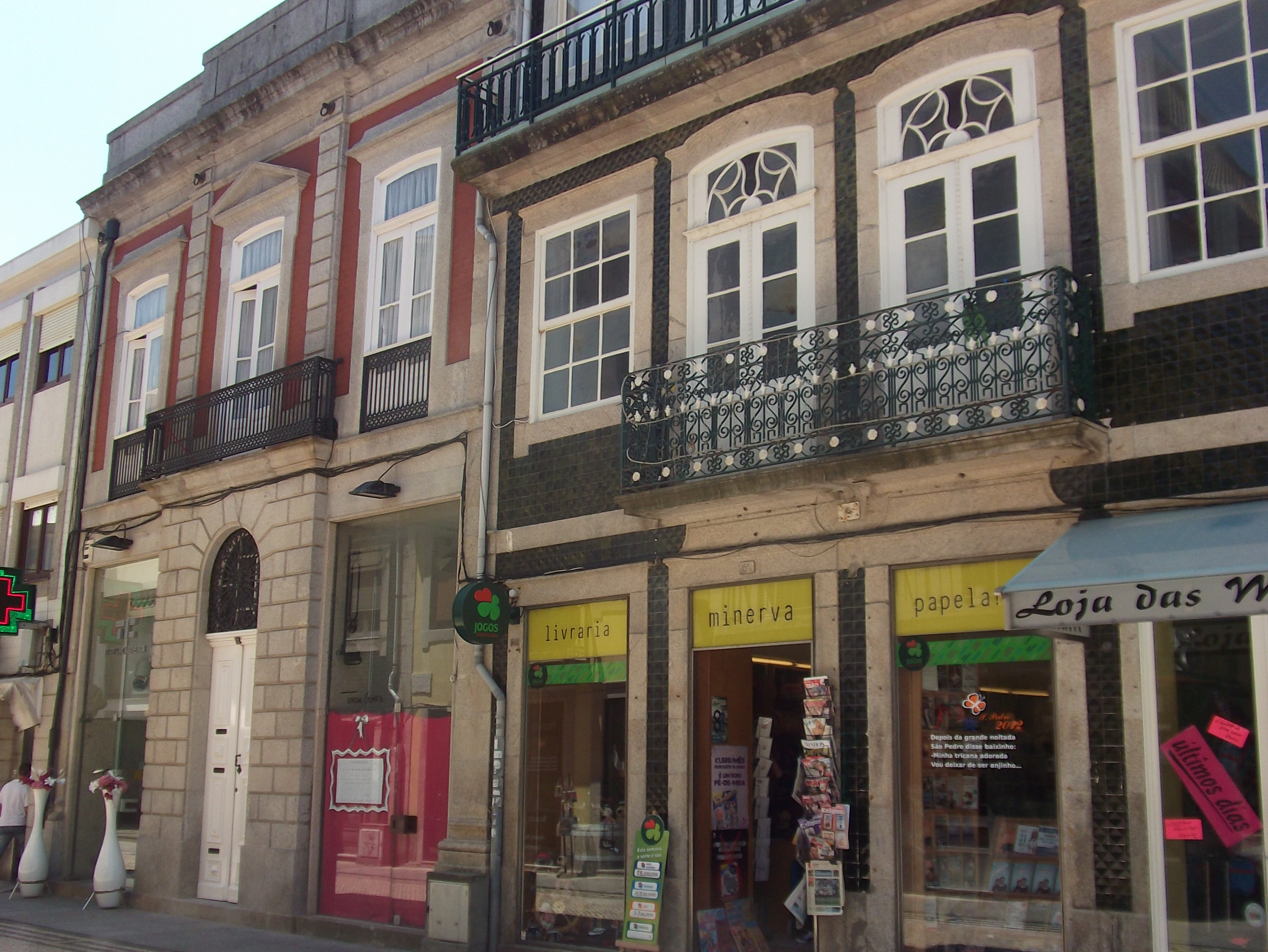
Neoclassical bourgeois adaptation in Junqueira

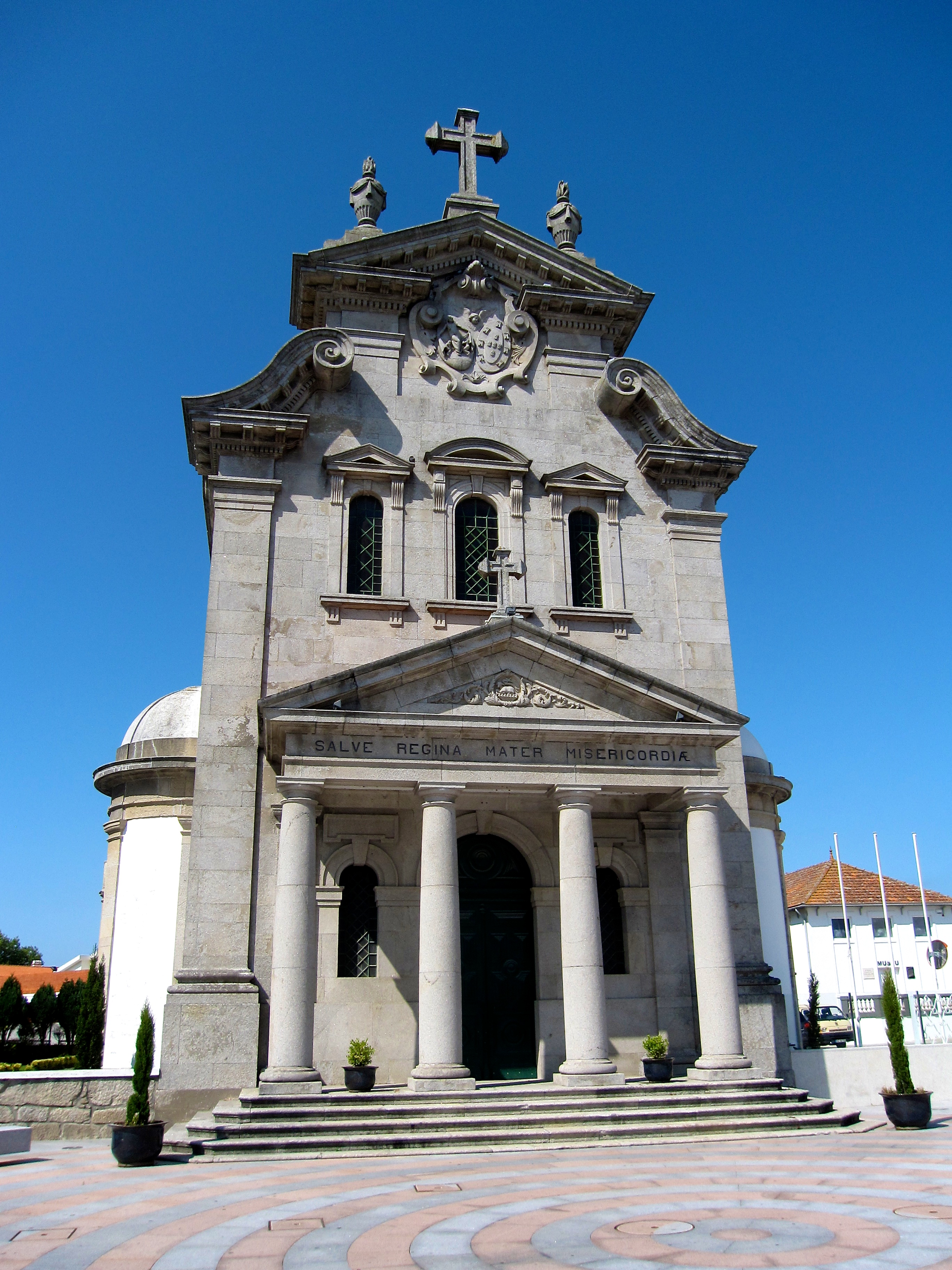
Façade of Misericórdia Church

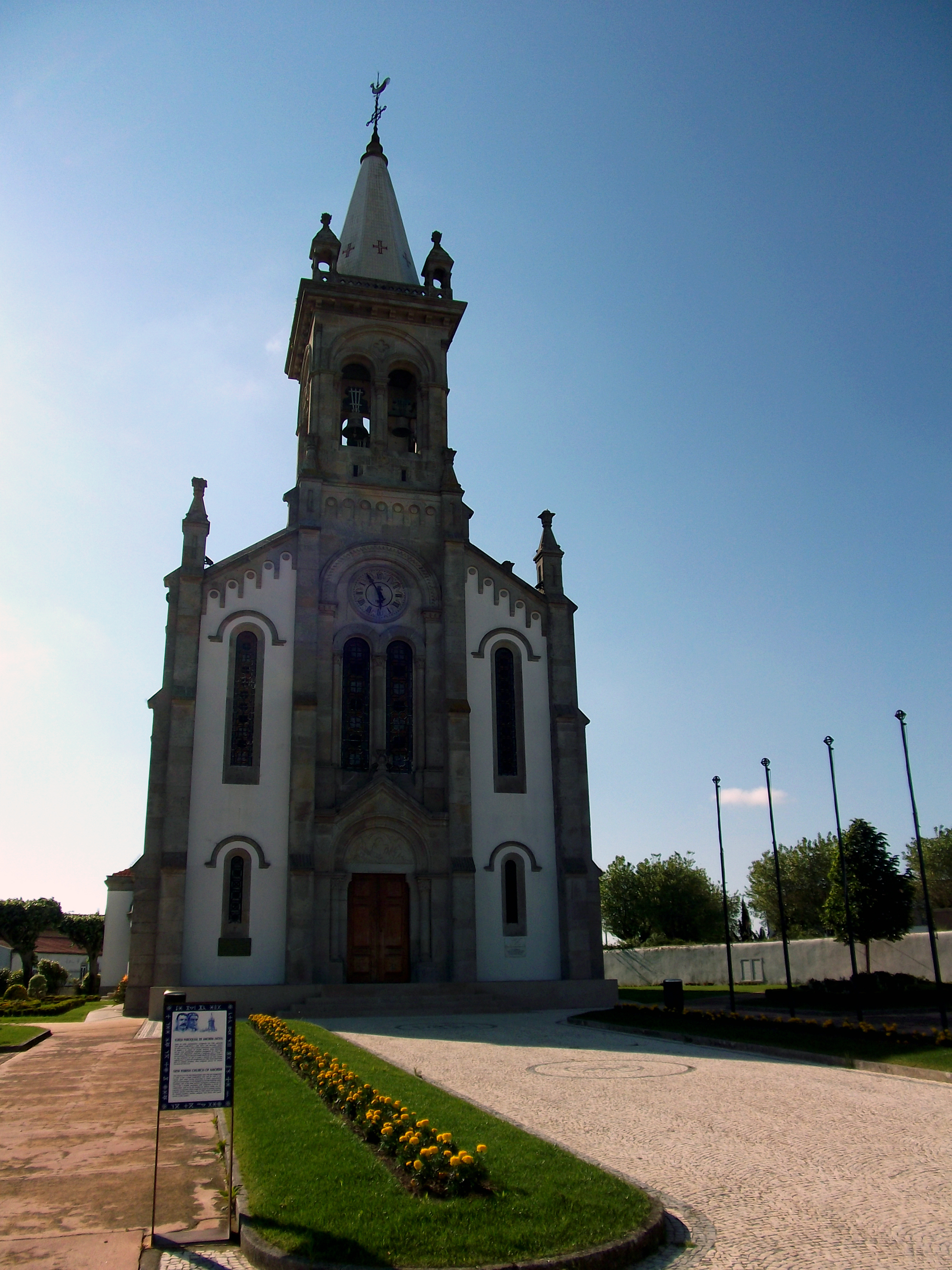
Amorim church (1922), Romanesque revival style

== Early vernacular ==
Vernacular buildings in the fishermen's district were described by Raul Brandão as "Eskimo burrows"; many of these simple houses were very low buildings and while most have been lost, some have survived to the modern period, some as ruins. One is so well preserved, including interiors, that it is planned to make it a museum. The house and ruins of others are located in Rua dos Ferreiros (Portuguese for the Street of the Blacksmiths), a street around the Port of Póvoa de Varzim, the earliest records of which date to 1568. The fishermen's quarter, with other new parallel streets, developed rapidly after 1761.

The impact of the Age of Discovery was felt in Póvoa de Varzim, despite emigration to the newly discovered lands which began very early. In the 16th century, single-storey houses dominated the town's landscape, but a rising bourgeoisie built houses of multiple floors with rich architecture. This bourgeoisie were the merchant class, such as Amador Alvares, pilot of the route to India, or pilots Pedro Fernandes, Diogo Pyz de São Pedro, and Lourenço Dias among others. Very few buildings remain from the Age of Discovery or the early Portuguese imperial age. A notable one endures: the House of António Cardia, Póvoa de Varzim's Town Hall Judge and Liberator of Salvador da Bahia in Brazil.

Santo André Chapel has vernacular architecture probably dating to the medieval period. It was referred in 1546 and in earlier documents. Altarpieces are neoclassical, however it retains older icons, from the 17th century onward. A much older icon from this chapel, from the 15th century, is preserved in Pius XII Museum in the nearby city of Braga.

Early vernacular
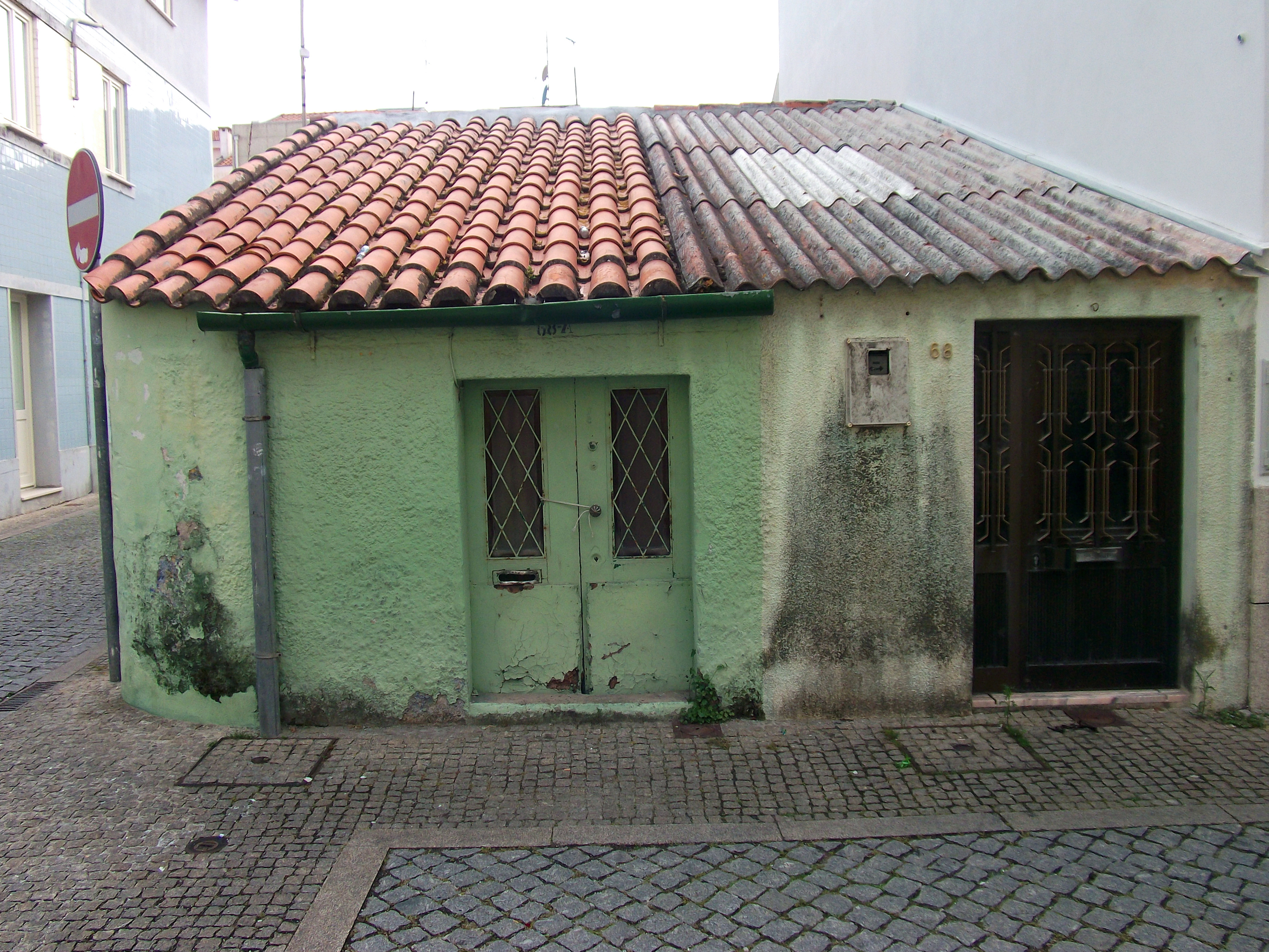
Preserved fisherman's house in Bairro Sul

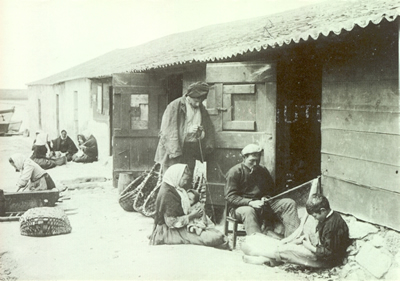
Fishermen's houses in Bairro Sul

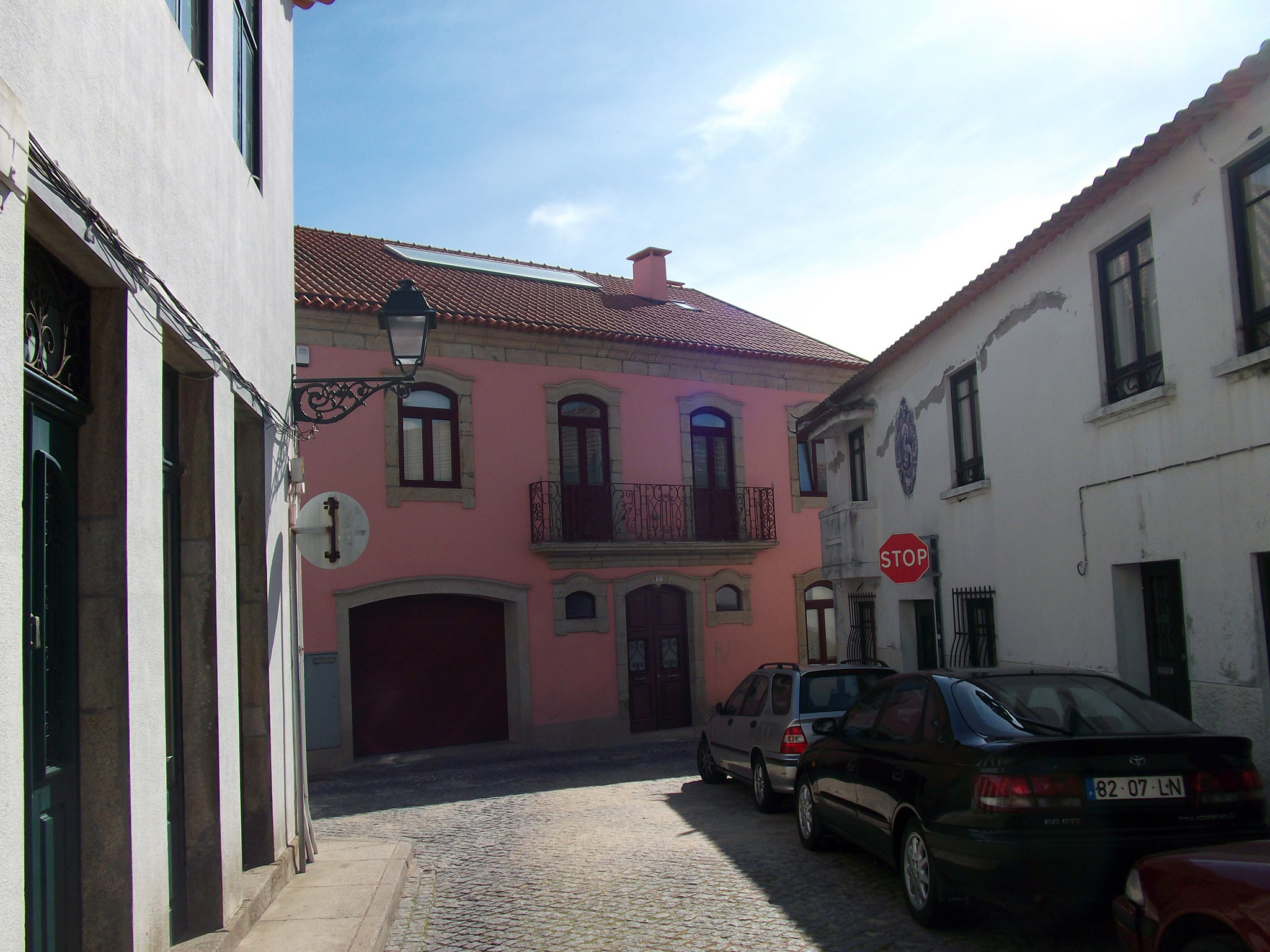
Bourgeois house in Bairro da Matriz

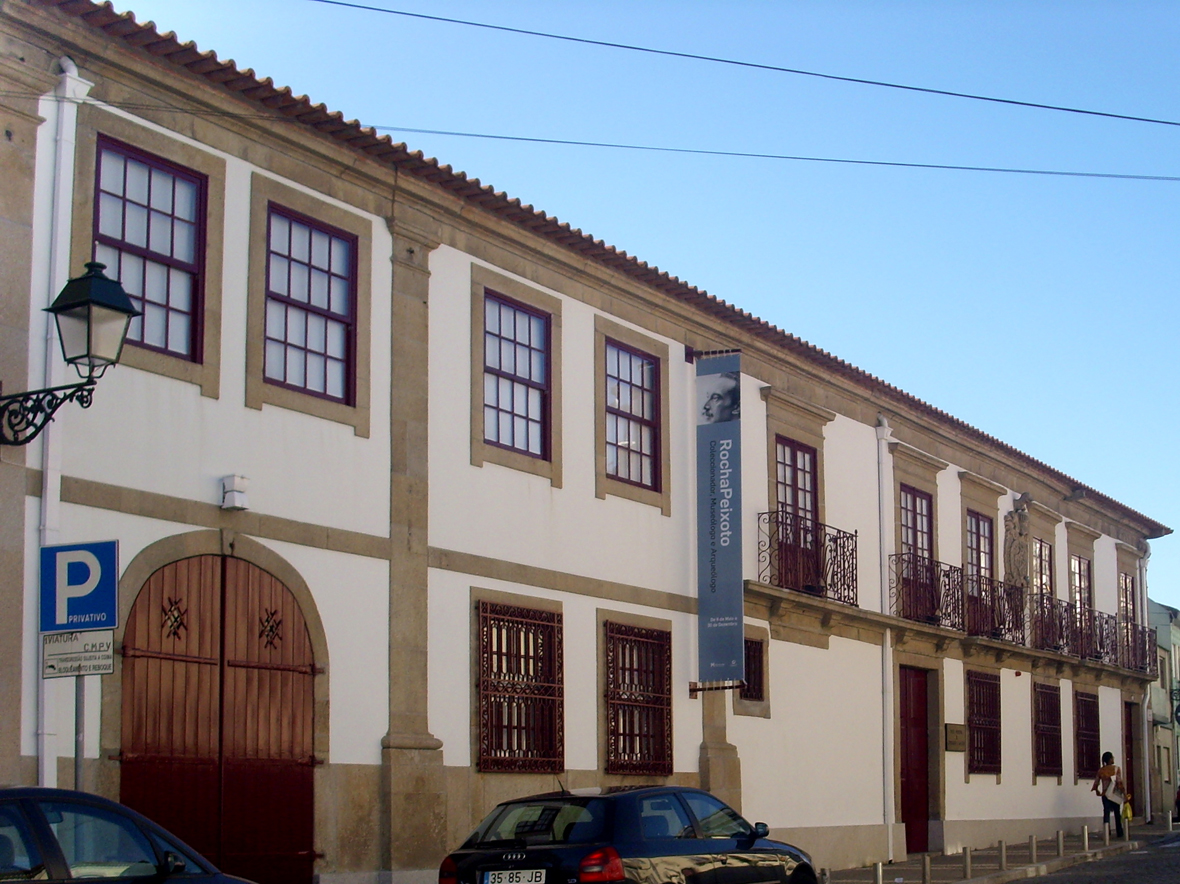
Nobleman's house, currently a museum, in Bairro da Matriz

== Romanticism ==
In the 19th and early 20th centuries, Romantic and traditionalist styles developed in the urban core, around Praça do Almada and the Junqueira shopping quarter, where the bourgeoisie built houses with richly decorated architecture, adapting international, national and local preferences. This period was marked by a conservative, rational and naturalist classicism and driven by the bourgeoisie and architects who created buildings according to the bourgeois inclination. This bourgeoisie included successful Portuguese-Brazilians and those involved in commerce. In the 19th century, azulejo tilework started being generally used by the bourgeoisie to decorate façades. The fisher community followed the trend and continued using tiles in vernacular architecture until well into the 20th century. The most prolific period was between 1850 and 1950 and some of these panels have eclectic, Art Nouveau, Art Déco, Historicist or nationalist character and are an important part of the local cultural heritage.

Azulejo façades
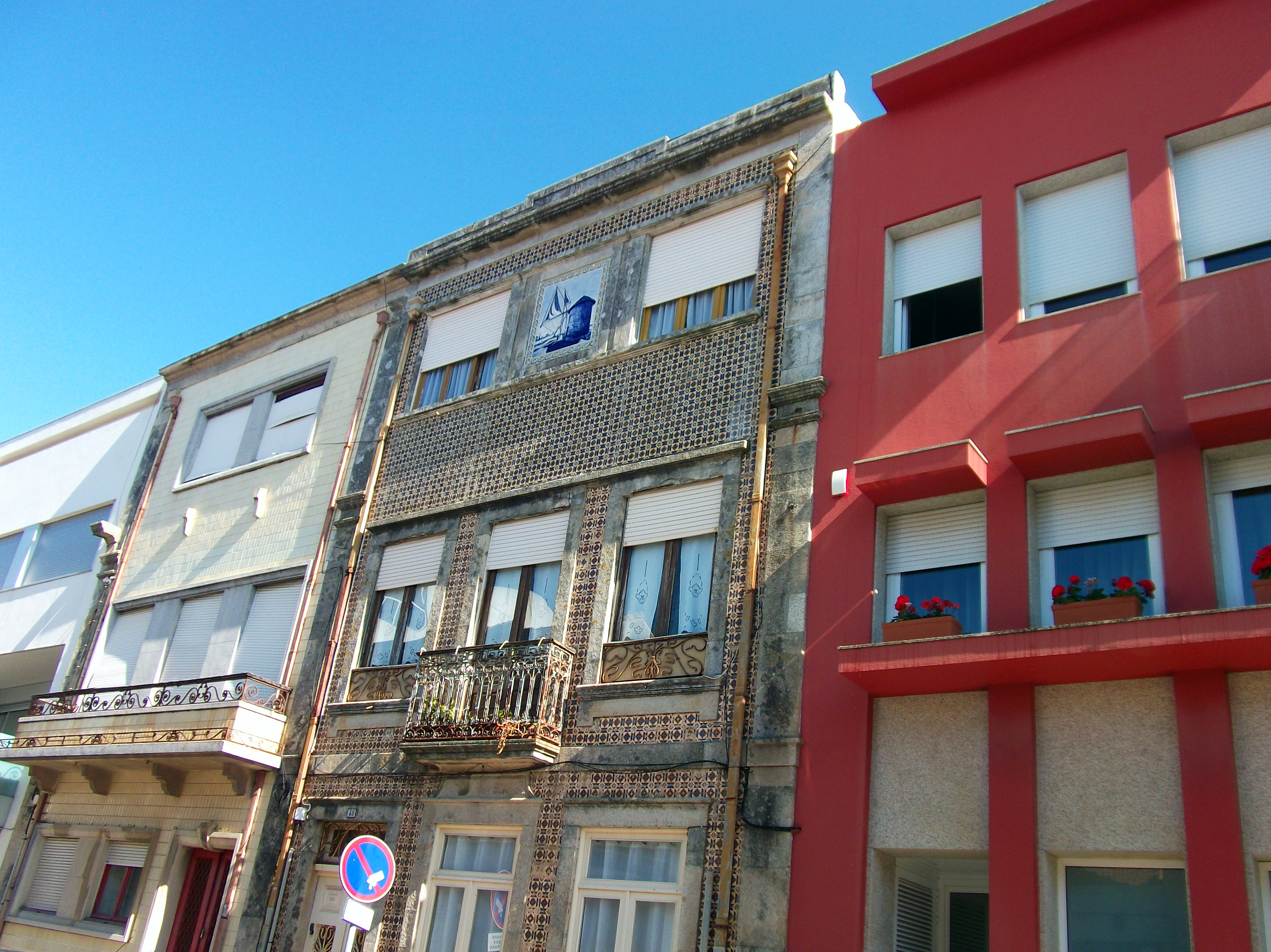
Two types of Azulejo façade and a top panel

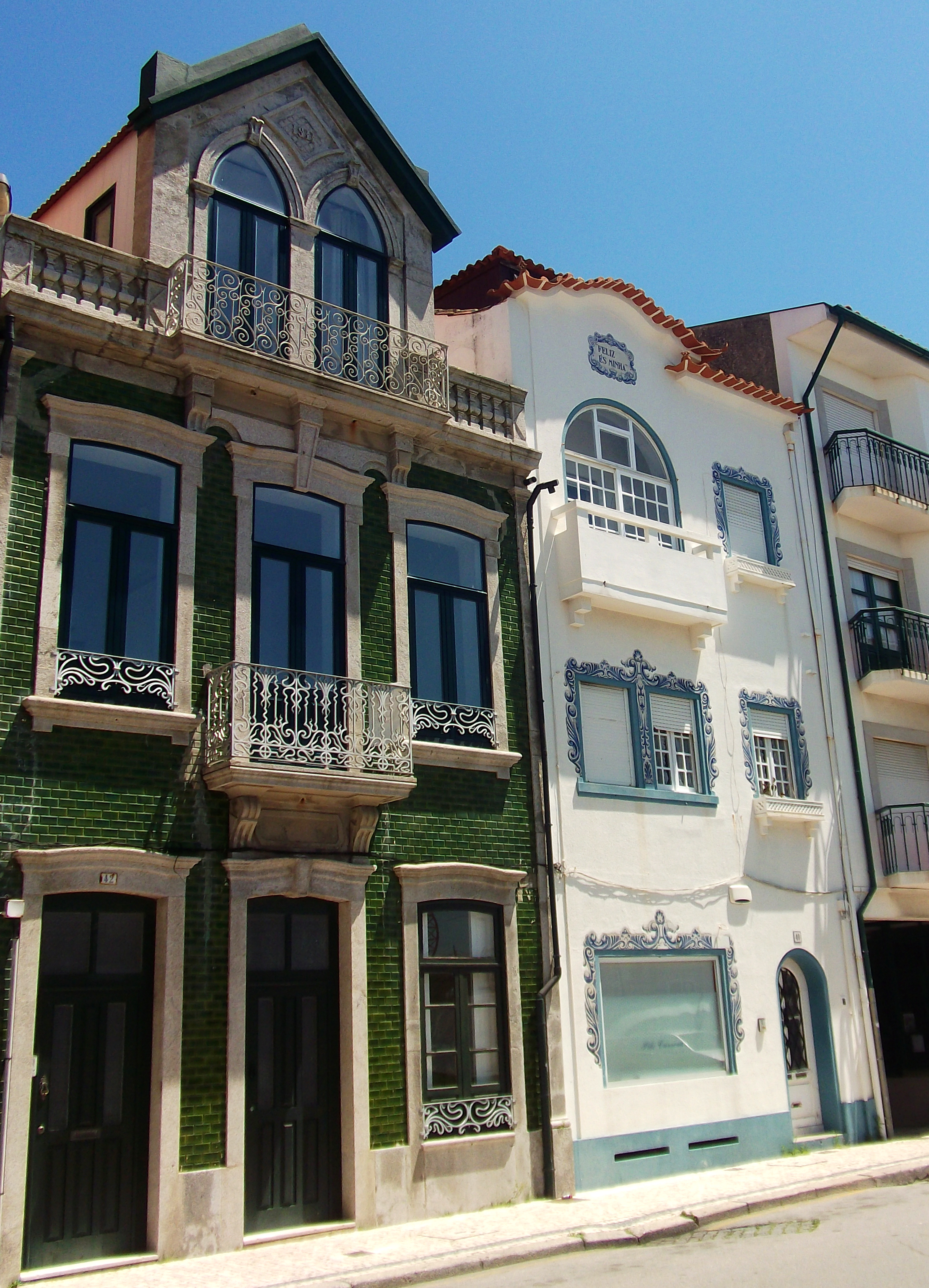
Rua Tenente Valadim

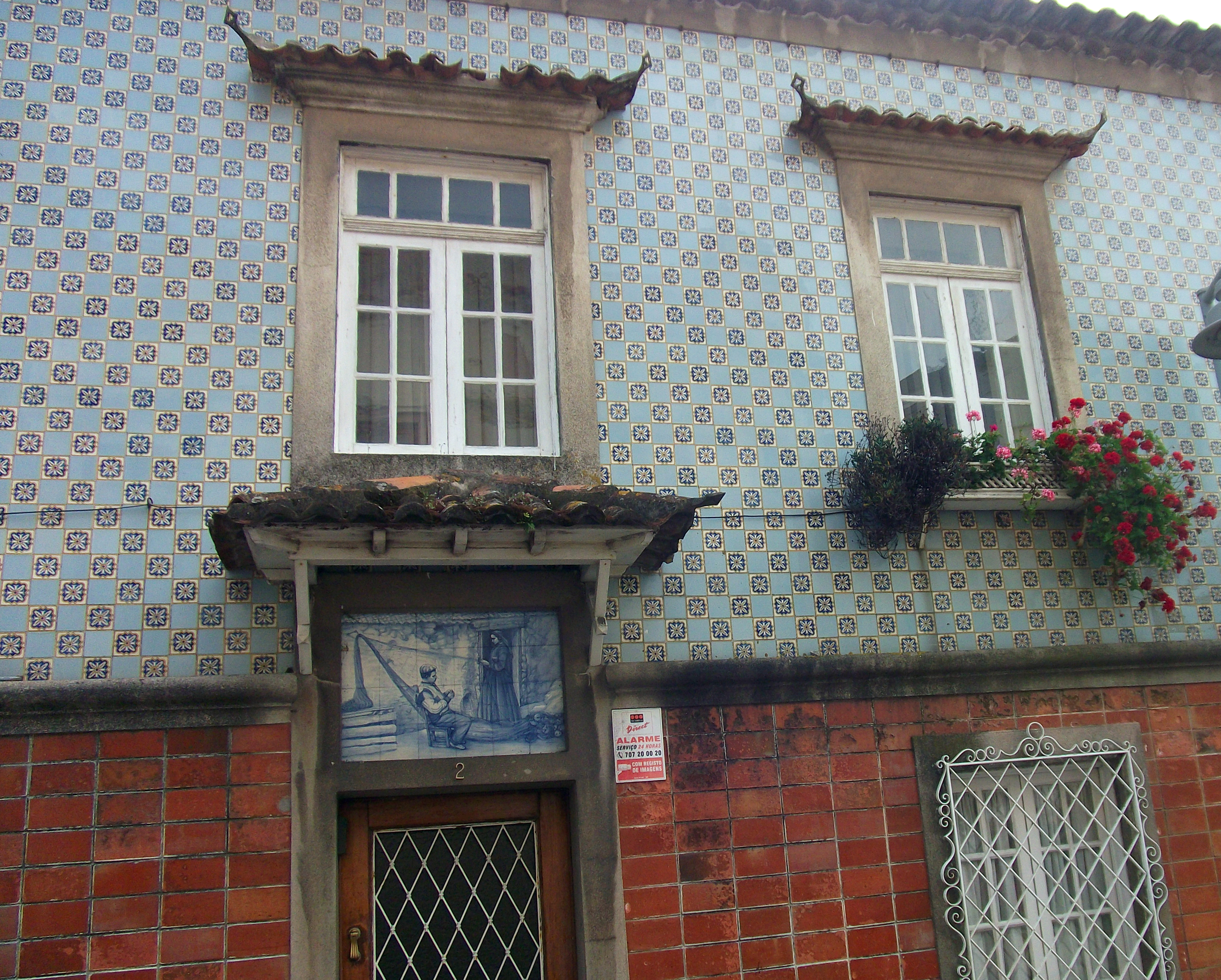
Azulejo façade in Bairro Sul with door panel.

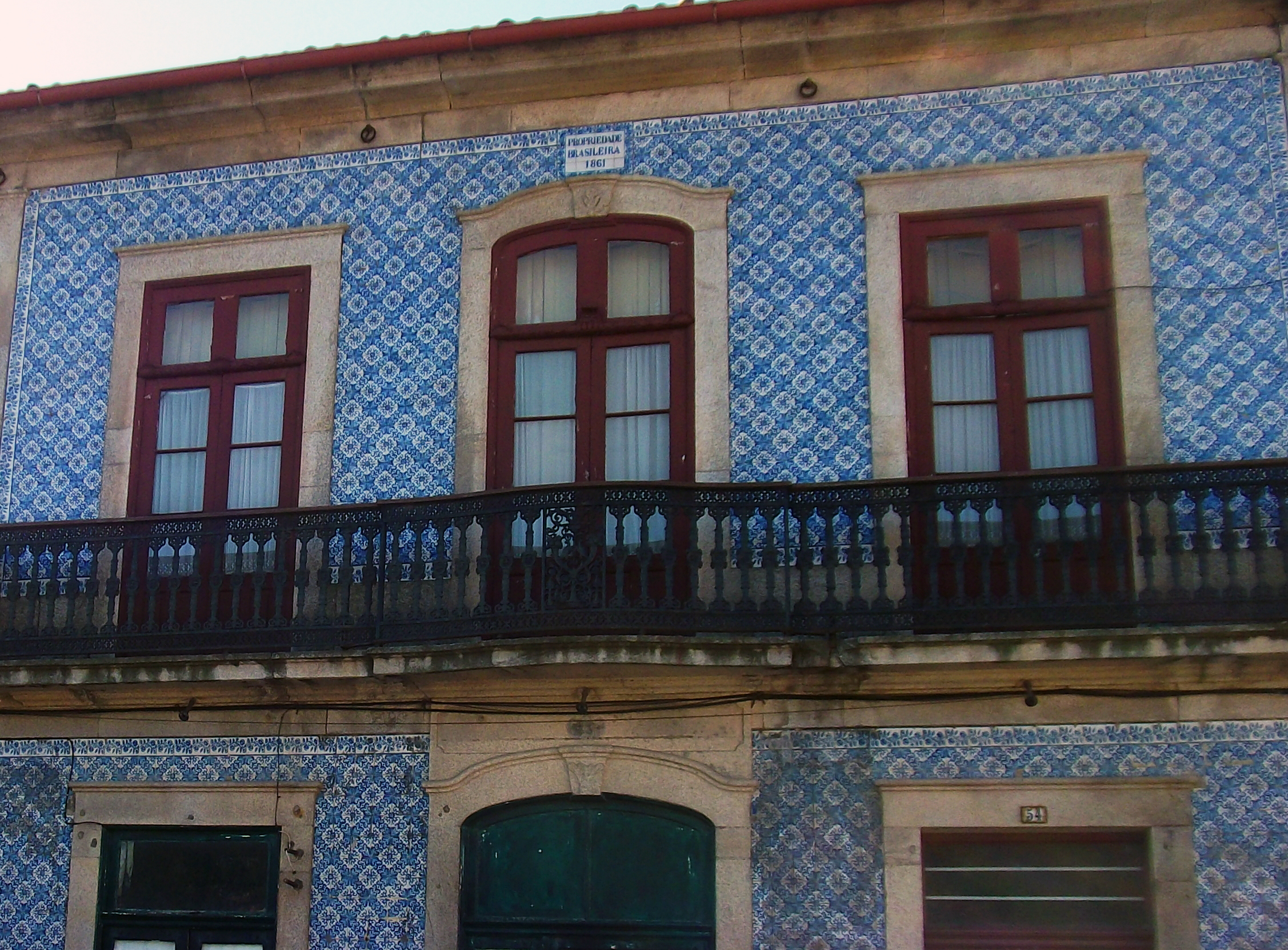
1861 Portuguese-Brazilian Façade in Praça do Almada

Some urban Romantic villas remain in Avenida Mouzinho de Albuquerque and other streets in the urban core. Quinta de Beiriz is a Romantic estate idealized by Alfredo de Almeida Brandão, a diplomat and a fine-arts lover. The estate includes gardens, lakes and a wooded park, fountains and mythical statuary. The small palace of the estate was built in the beginning of the 20th century, but several constructions are from the 18th century. It includes D. Hilda Chapel, which mimics Minho region sanctuaries from the 16th and 17th centuries, and living rooms with Portuguese-style Baroque woodcarvings. The azulejos used on the exterior walls of the palace include hunting and countryside motifs.

Romanticism
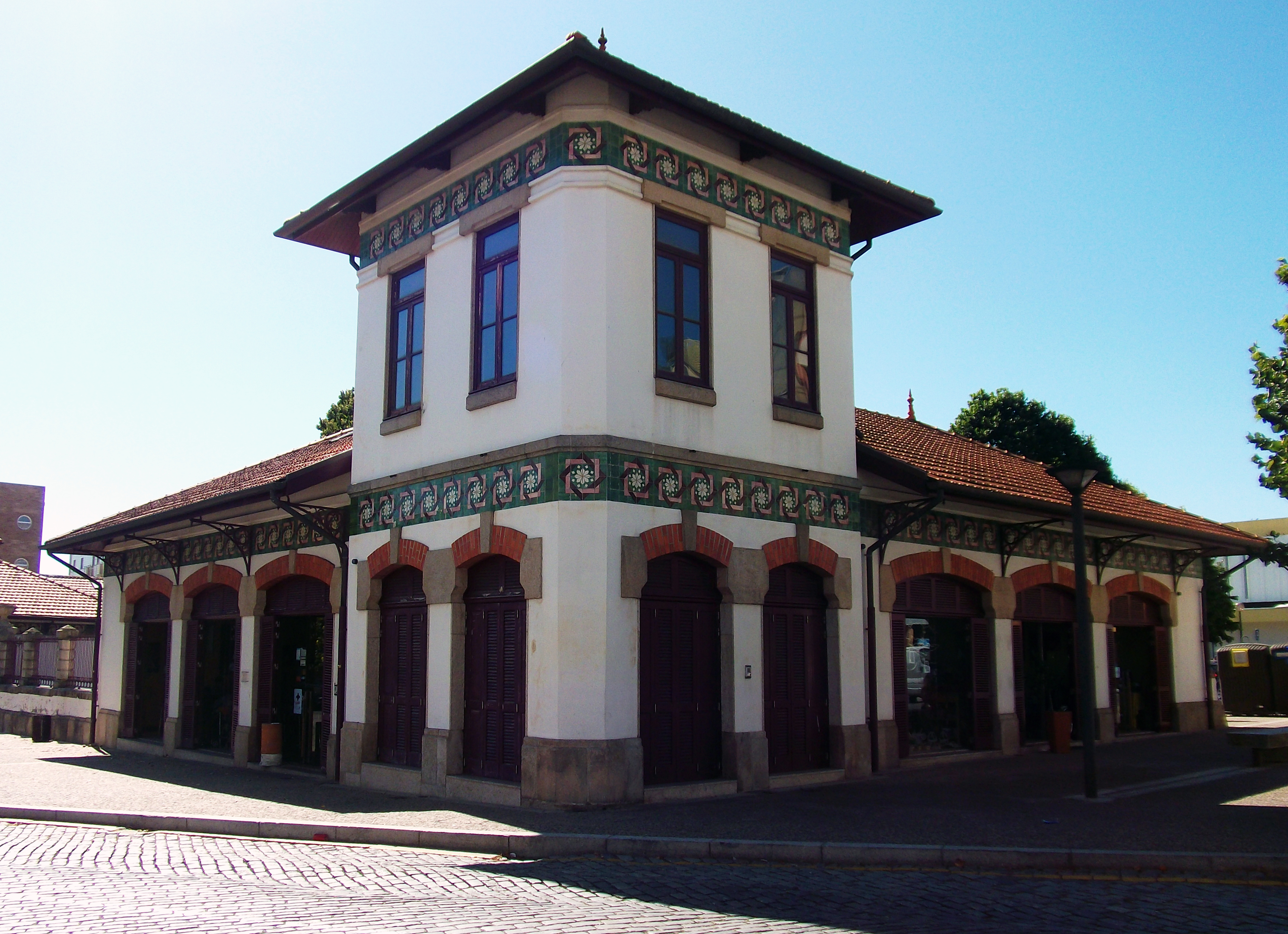
The Market square's wall towers (1904) were designed by architect Ventura Terra

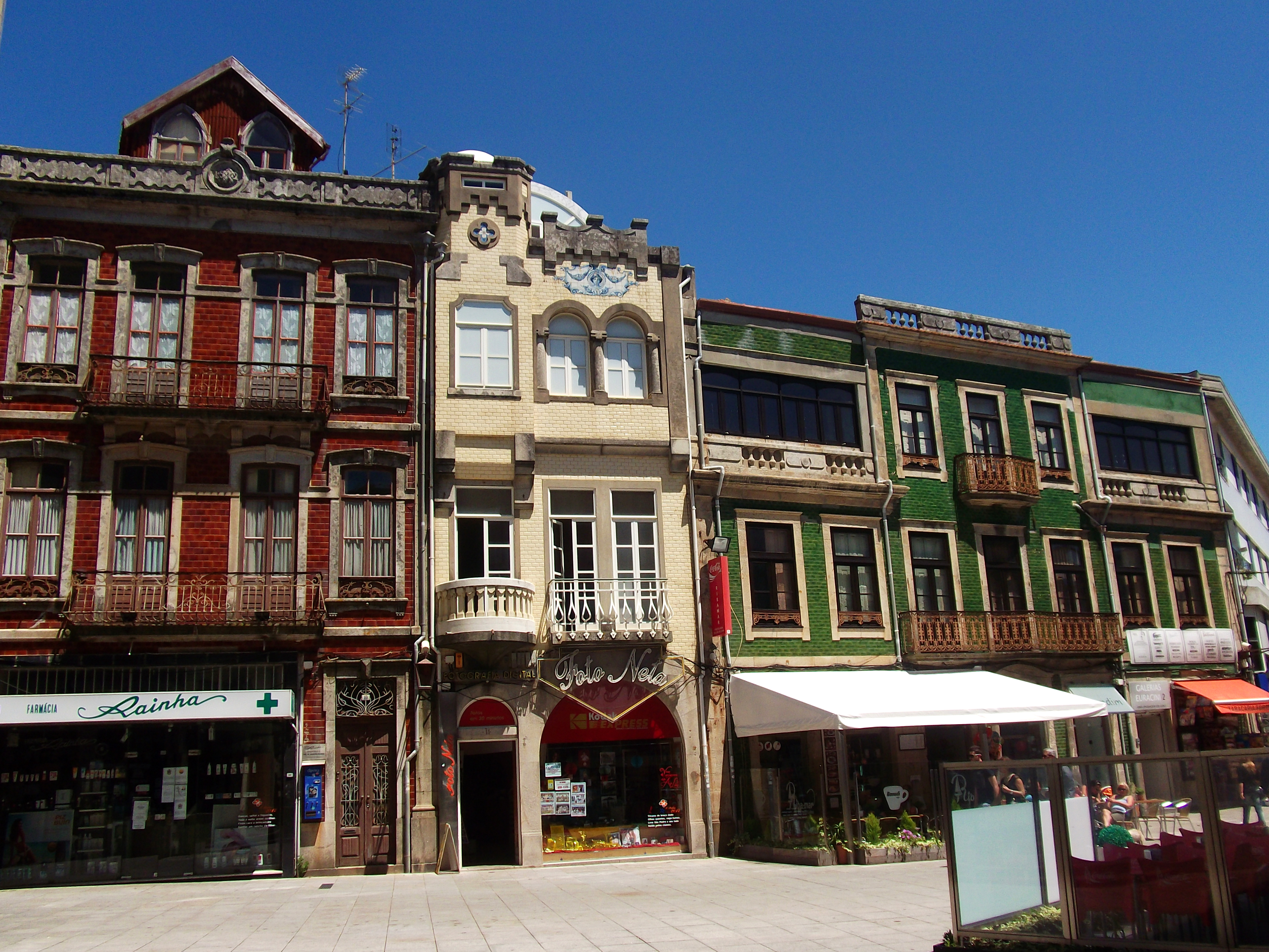
Largo David Alves in Junqueira, a bourgeois quarter

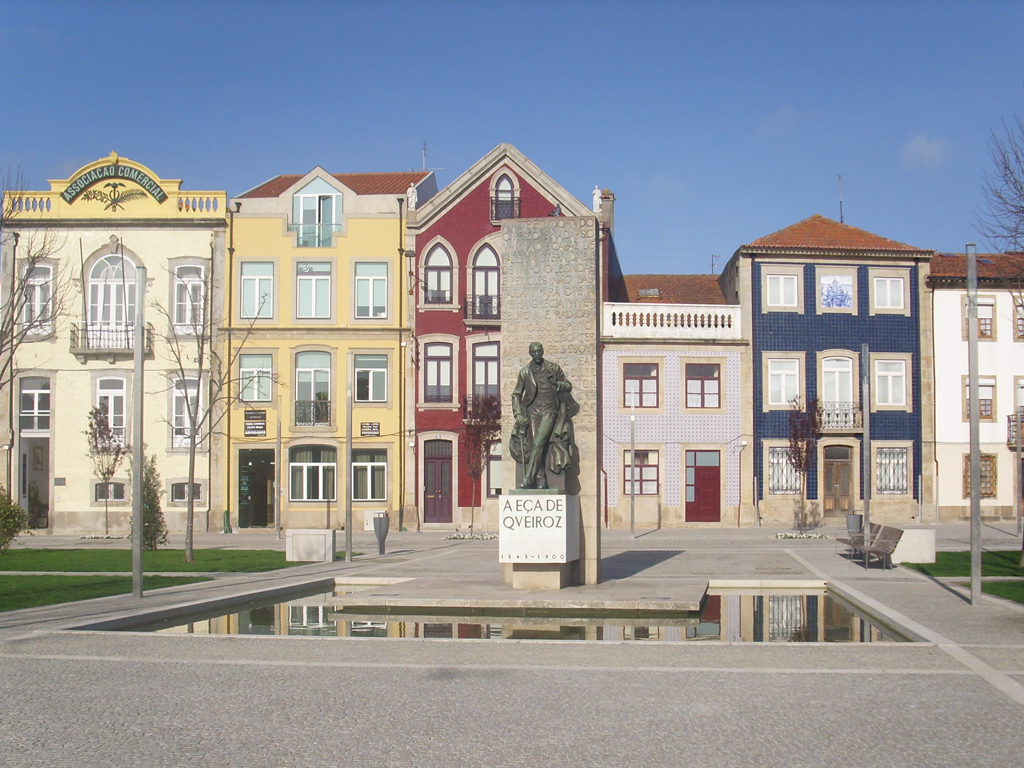
Praça do Almada East side

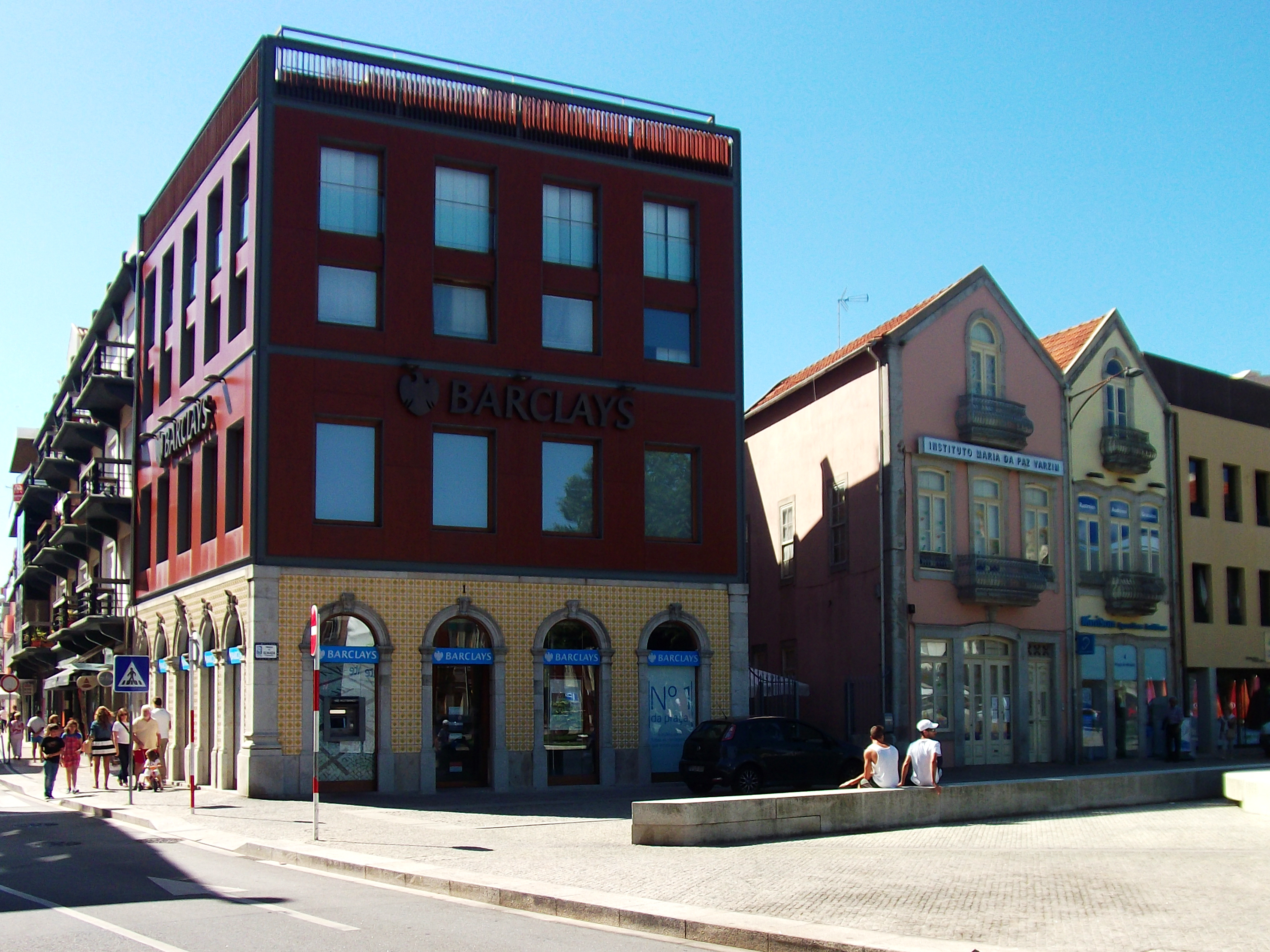
A building with 19th century relief Azulejo tilework on Praça do Almada West side

== Portuguese Modernism and New State styles ==
The Portuguese modernist style (Portuguese: Modernista) gradually evolved within the local tradition through a balanced process of absorbing universal influences in national architecture beginning during the New State regime at the end of the 1920s. Portuguese modernism in Póvoa de Varzim was prompted by tourism and can be seen in Rogério de Azevedo's iconic works in the city: the Casino da Póvoa and Grande Hotel da Póvoa (Hotel Palácio). Azevedo was, beginning in 1931, responsible for these projects and was influenced by his master José Marques da Silva, and by the French and Flemish Renaissance. Other modernist buildings include Senhora do Desterro Chapel, Villa Myosótis, and other buildings such as the Nossa Senhora da Boa Viagem Church on the edge of the city, a modernist edifice in neo-Gothic style with a towering façade which was built in the 1950s.

The New State Style or Soft Portuguese style, which developed in the 1940s, can be seen in Póvoa de Varzim Palace of Justice. It is by Rodrigues Lima, who also designed several other similar courts and palaces of justice in Portugal. It has a classicist monumental architecture with load-bearing walls, friezes, cornices, and rectangular-shaped columns alternating with large bronze sculptures.

Modernism
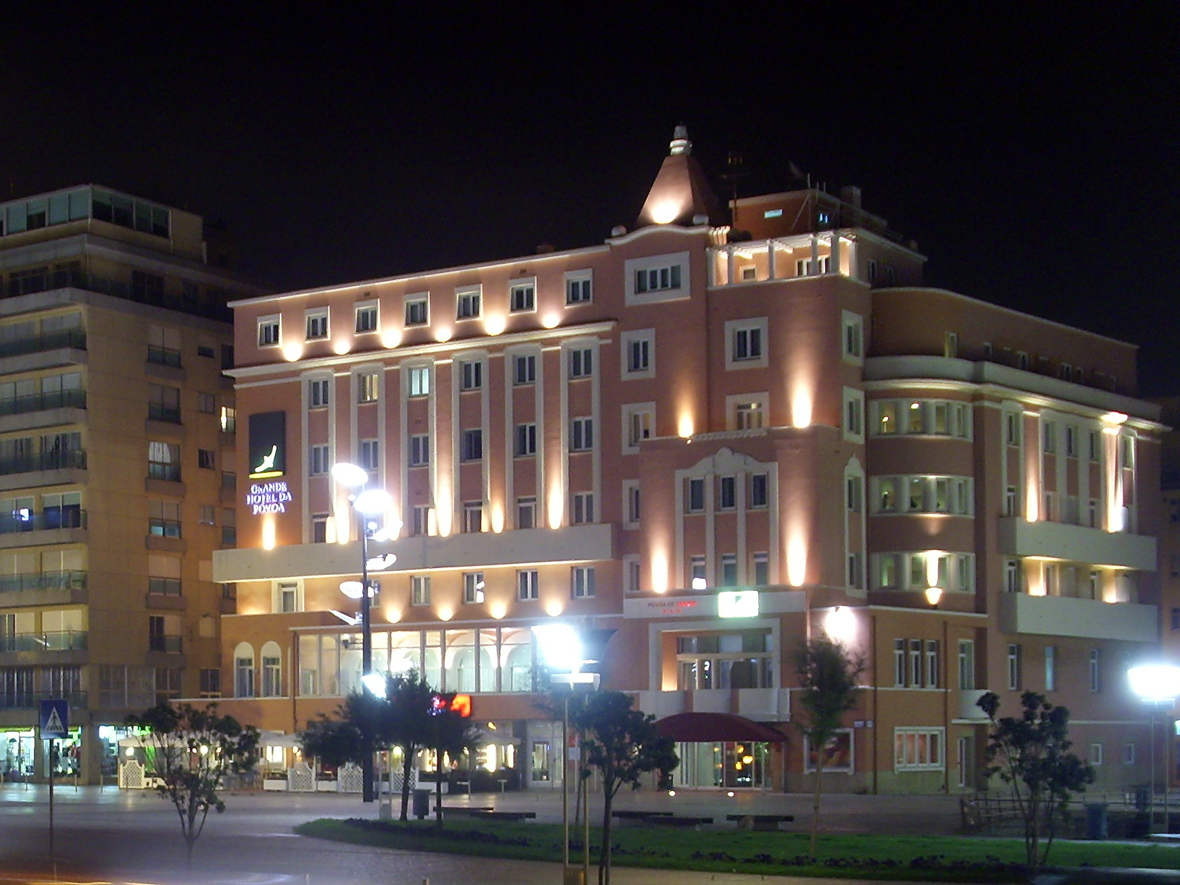
Grande Hotel da Póvoa

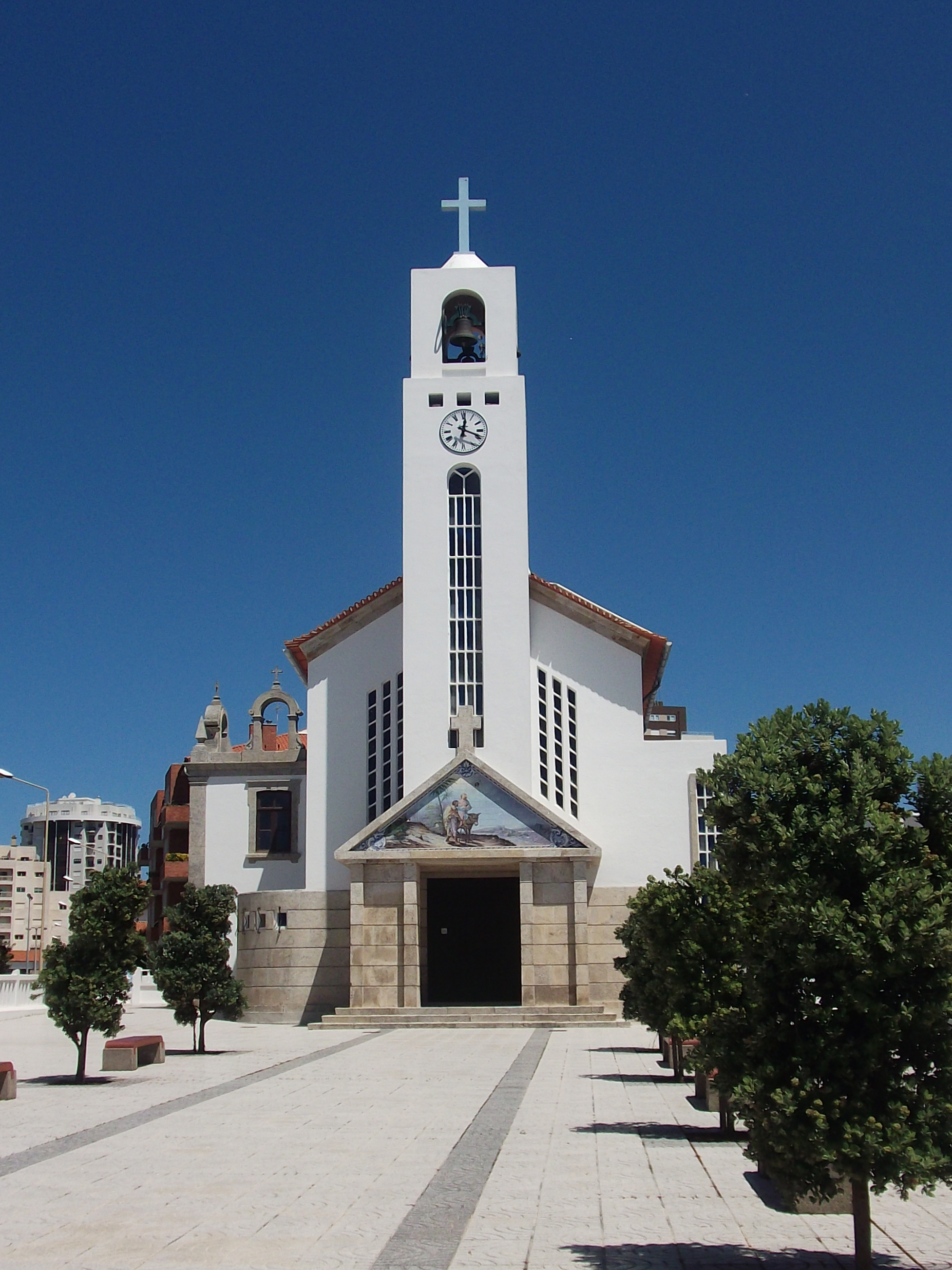
Desterro Chapel, built between 1936 and 1937

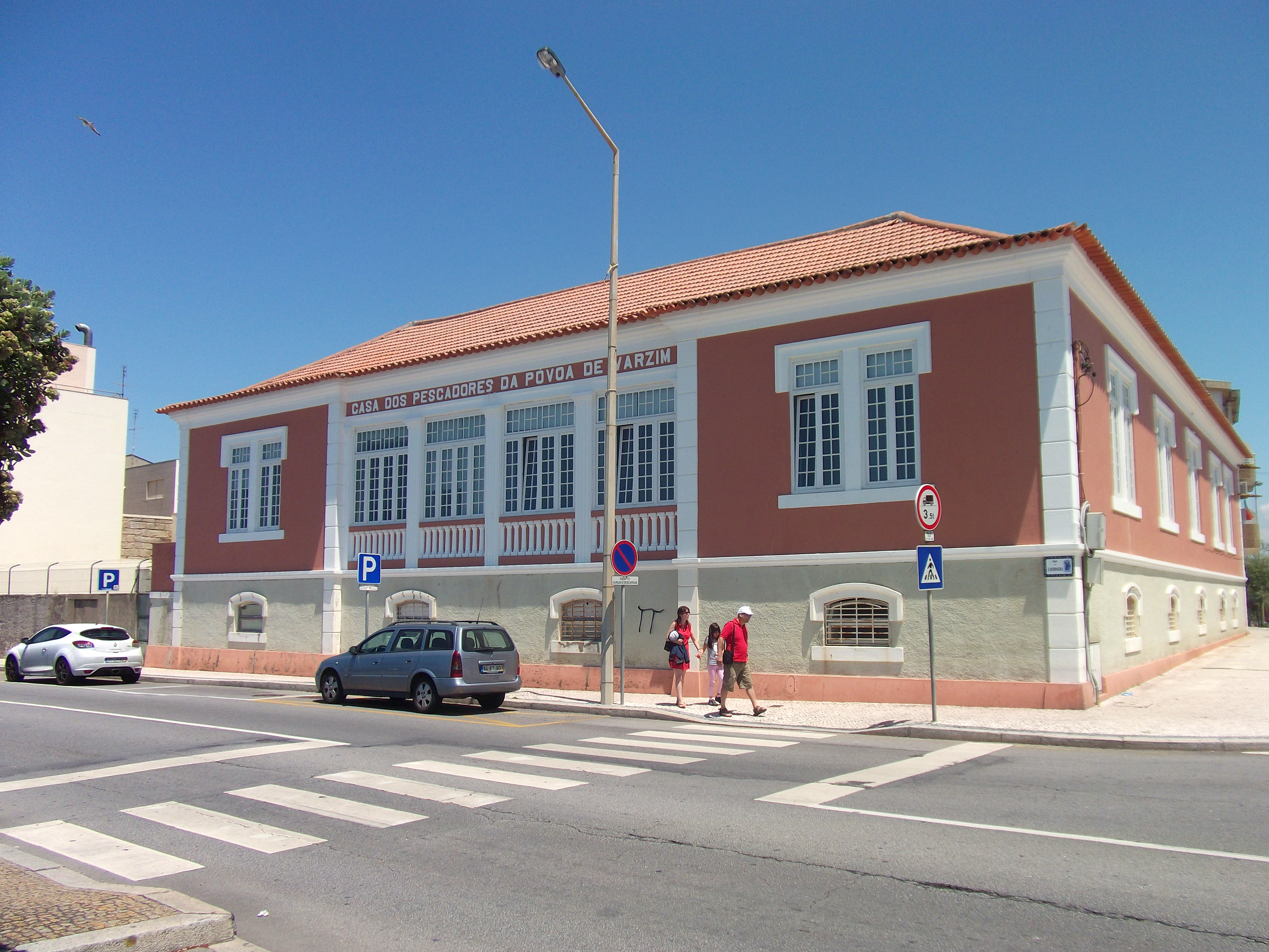
Casa dos Pescadores (Fishermen's House, 1926)

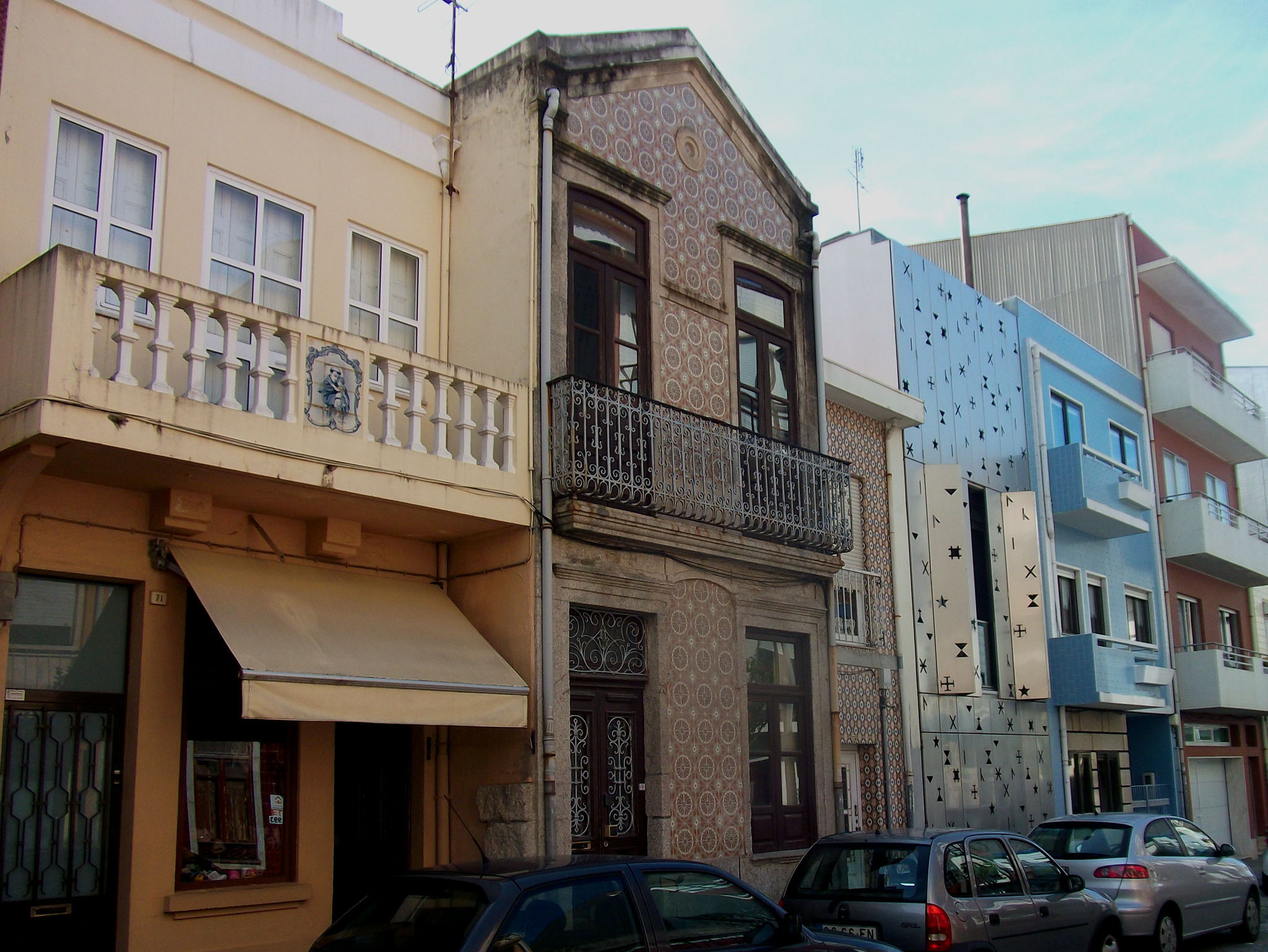
Vernacular architecture from the late 19th century through the 1950s, coexisting with a contemporary house, façade by architect José Cadilhe.

== Contemporary ==
In 1949, architect Alfredo Coelho de Magalhães designed Póvoa de Varzim Bullring, which was built using functionalist architecture with a tendency to geometrical artistic expression. Since the 1960s, a new style based on the modernist movement, with a linear, fortress-like and blockish appearance, began to dominate the city, with controversial demolitions of earlier buildings in the city centre. Conflict over this continues in the 21st century. Loosening construction regulations, beach tourism amongst the general population and the independence of Angola and Mozambique, resulting in an influx of Portuguese-Africans into the city, caused rapid development and redevelopment and urbanization concerns that the city still has to deal with in the present day.

The contemporary architectural style of the School of Porto, supported by purist modernist models, was introduced in the city as early as 1964 by Álvaro Siza around Eça de Queirós High School. Architect Álvaro Siza work in Póvoa de Varzim started with Casa Alves Santos. In 1973, a notable project by Siza named Casa Beires and nicknamed "The Bomb House", near Casa Alves Santos, started being built. Álvaro Siza started the project by imagining what would happen to a cube if the edges exploded. While the cube was perfect as a cube, it was not as a house, and by virtually exploding a bomb in one of the cube's edges, a garden would be created, and hence a private space, and at the same time a transitional space to the public area.

Projects based on the style started to appear in significant numbers in the early 2000s, especially in residences, with Jean Pierre Porcher's Portas do Parque being the finest example on a larger scale and selected for the "Habitar Portugal 2003/2005" showcase held by MAPEI and the Order of Portuguese Architects. Portas do Parque and other buildings in 25 de Abril Avenue have unitary and monochromatic façades, predetermined by the urbanization plan, in an attempt to restructure the periphery of the city, with Portas do Parque being the "gateway" or "channel of access" to the avenue.

Contemporary styles
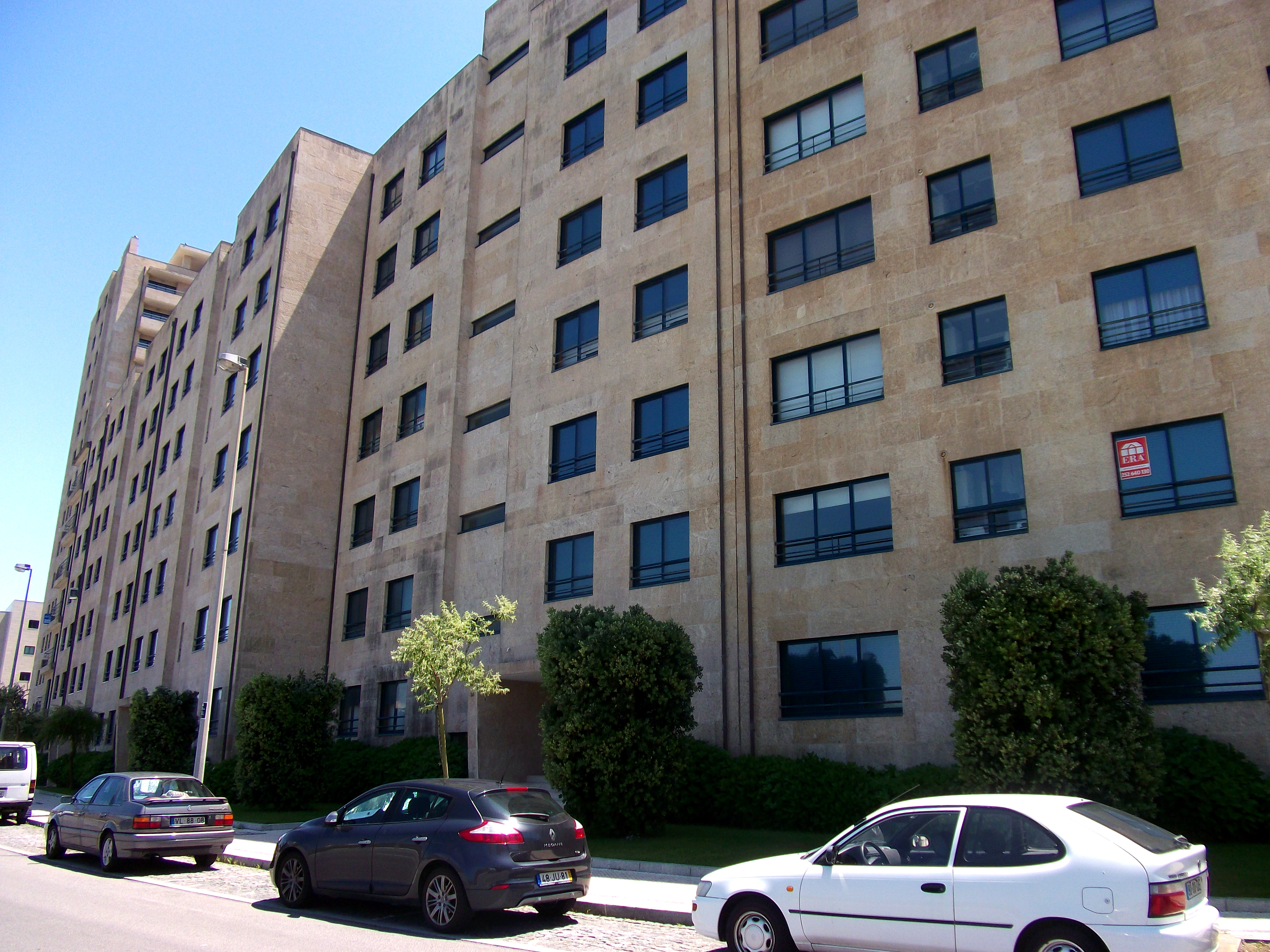
Forte de São Pedro. Granite plates are a new trend in 21st-century façades.

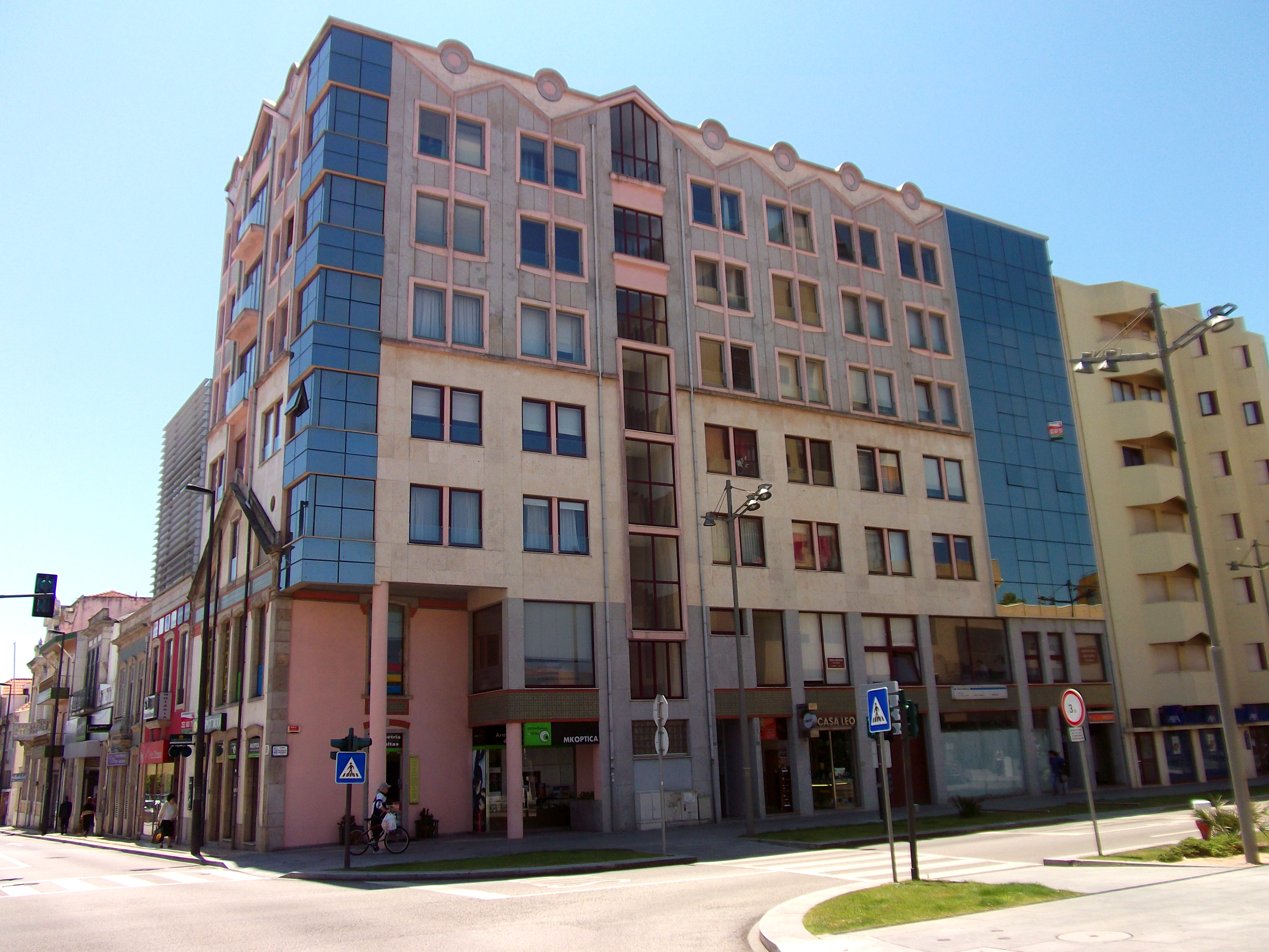
Multifamily and office building incorporating an historical house and adapted to distinct existing typologies

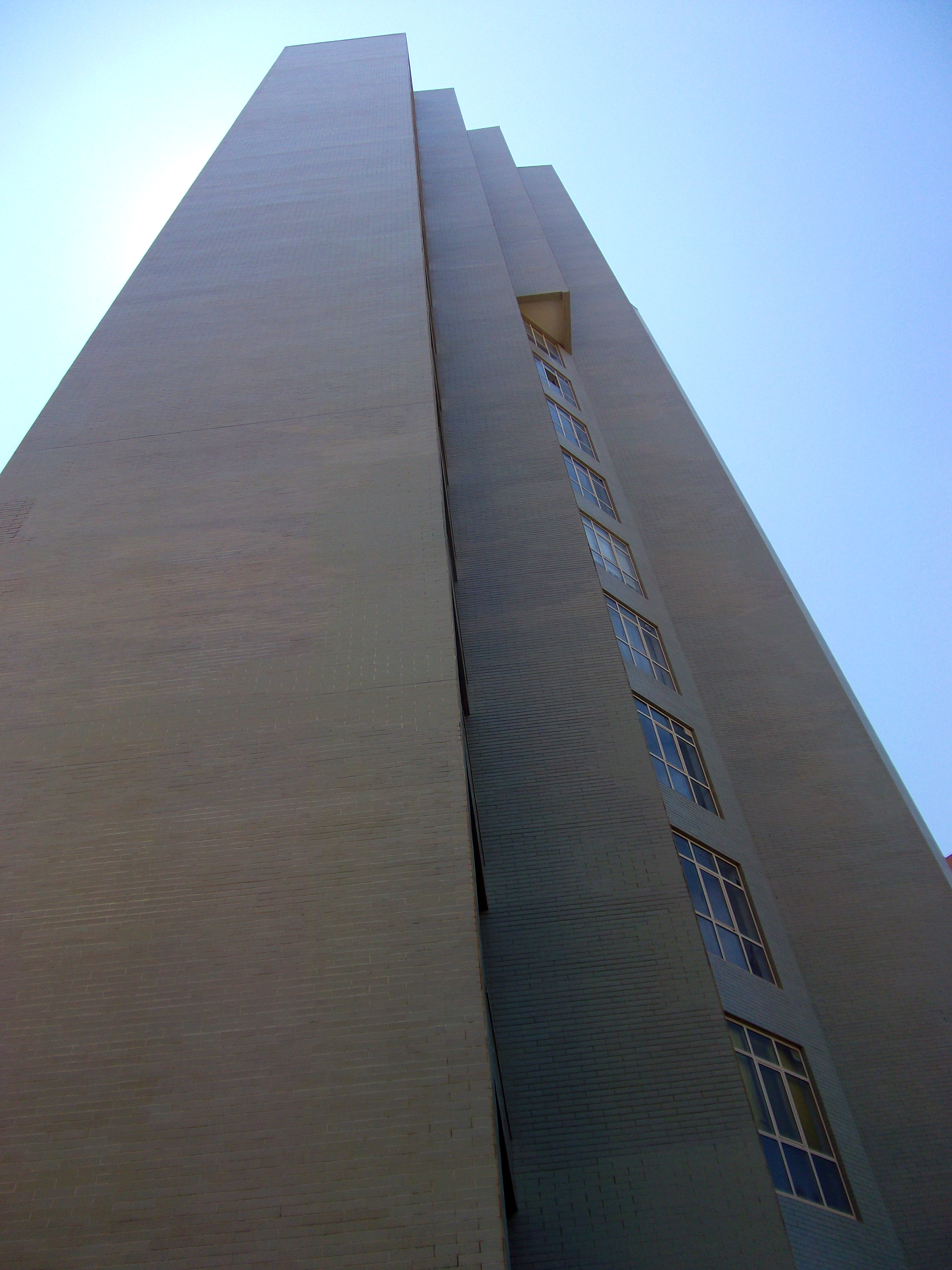
Side view of 70 Tower, the second-tallest building in Póvoa de Varzim. Late 20th century.

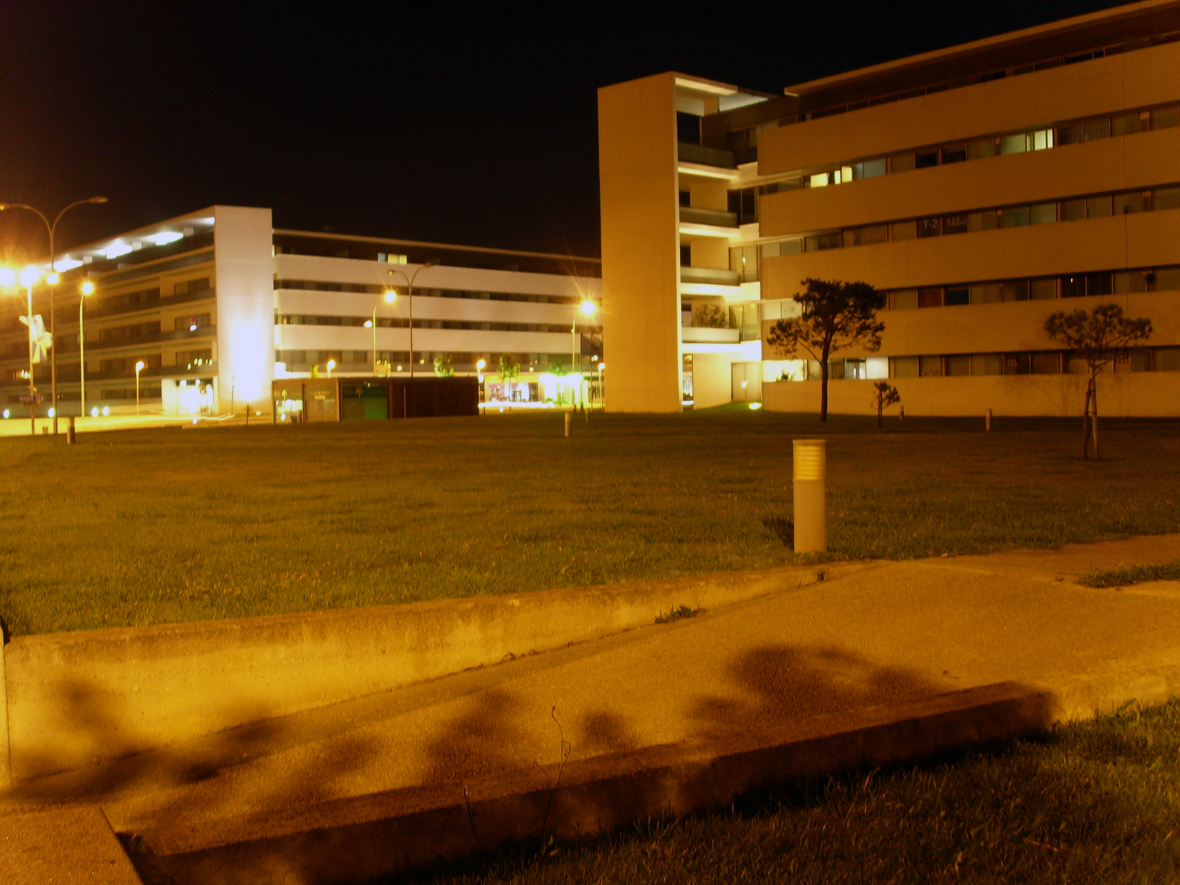
Portas do Parque buildings
