= Fort São João Baptista of Esposente =

Fort São João Baptista
- Forte de São João Baptista
- Esposende, Portugal
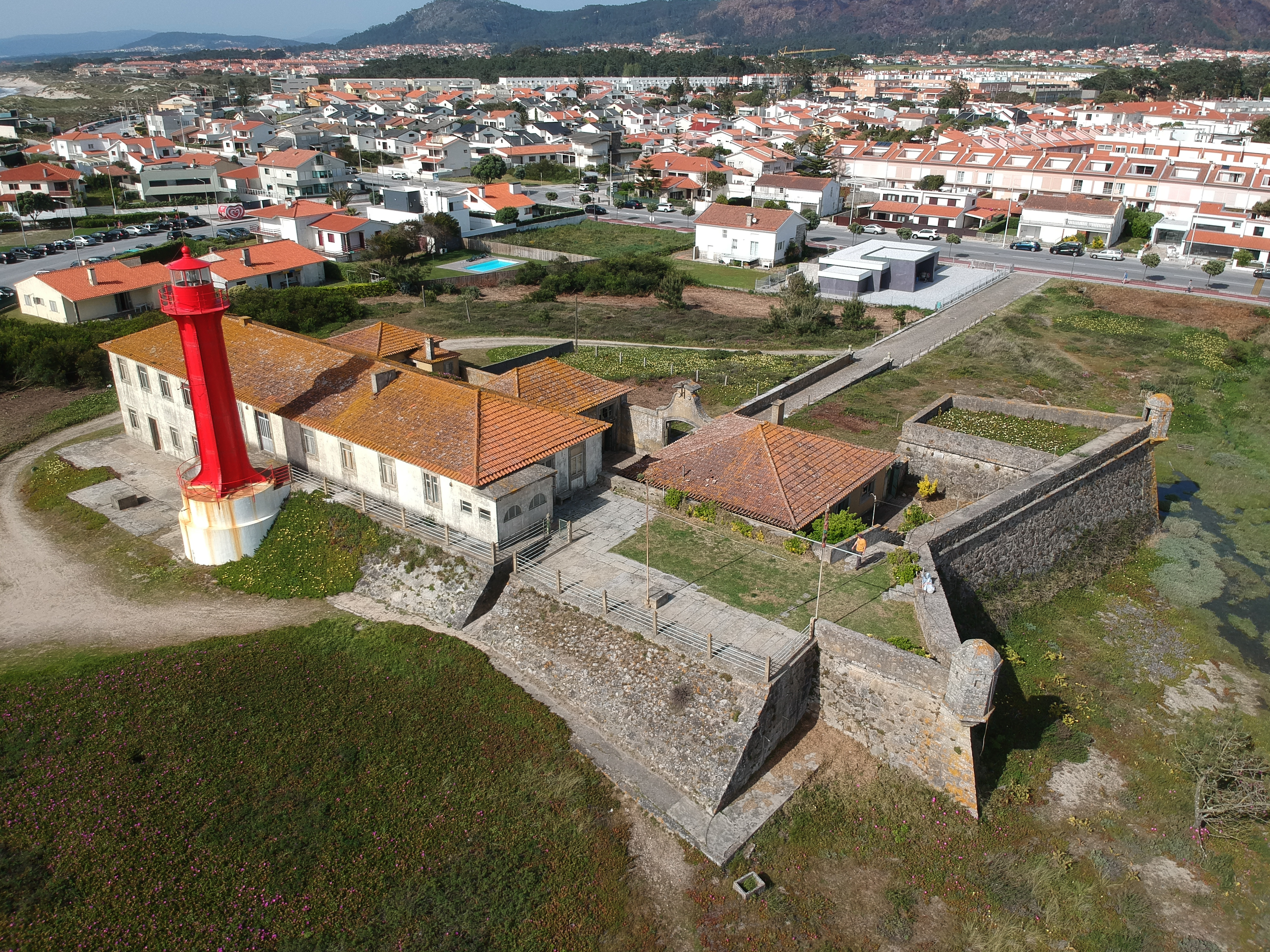
- Aerial photograph of Esposende Fort in 2019

Site information
- Type: Bastion fort

Location
- Coordinates: 41°32′34″N 8°47′26″W

Site history
- Built: 1699 - 1704
- In use: 17th-21st century.

Fort São João Baptista of Esposende, also referred to as São João Baptista Castle and Esposende Fort, is located in the parish of Esposende, Marinhas e Gandra, city and municipality of Esposende, in the district of Braga, in Portugal.

A coastal fort, originally built with the role of defending the mouth of the river Cávado.

== History ==
Built between 1699 and 1704, under the reign of Peter II of Portugal (1667-1706), it features an irregular star-shaped plan, with a bulwark at each edge, and the respective hexagonal sentry box. On its embankment stood the service buildings, especially an 18th-century chapel.

With the construction of the lighthouse, it suffered some modifications to its structure, and is now a rectangle with only two bulwarks and respective guardhouse at each of its angles.

Four buildings of rectangular and quadrangular plan integrate it, with hipped roofs, of one floor, in ruins by 2019.

In 1866, a lenticular light was installed on the fort, and the current 7-meter-tall (23 ft) tower was commissioned to the Barbier, Bénard & Turenne company in 1925, being installed in April 10 of that year.

1866, Dezembro - instalação de um farolim lenticular montado num candelabro; 1883 - elaboração e aprovação pela Comissão de Faróis e balizas, do Projecto de alumiamento e balizagem dos portos do Continente do Reino, onde se previa a colocação de uma luz de porto, em Esposende; 1913 - an Associação Comercial e Industrial de Esposende informava o Ministro da Marinha que o actual farolim deveria ser substituido por um farol com vantagem de alcance luminoso; 1922

On the southwest side stands the lighthouse, with a cylindrical iron tower, on a circular cement base, with a lantern and service balcony, painted red. Adjoining the lighthouse is a rectangular building, with two floors painted yellow, for the lighthouse keepers.

It has been classified as a Property of Public Interest since 1982.

In September 2020, the Esposende City Council paid the Portuguese government 204 thousand euros for the rights over the fort, for a period of 50 years. In addition to cleaning work, two of the four buildings formerly intended for support services to the Lighthouse, created and installed in the area of the Fort, in the 20th century, were intervened, allowing citizens to enjoy the space. The contract provides for the investment of 1.5 million euros in the renovation of the property.

After the fort was handed over to the Municipality of Esposende, small interventions were carried out to organize exhibitions and cultural activities.

In March 2022, the Municipality of Esposende launched the public contest for the rehabilitation project of the fort, in the approximate amount of 260 thousand euros, with the object of elaborating the architectural and special projects based on the creation of conditions for public use, having as main service the installation of the North Coast Interpretive Center.

== Gallery ==
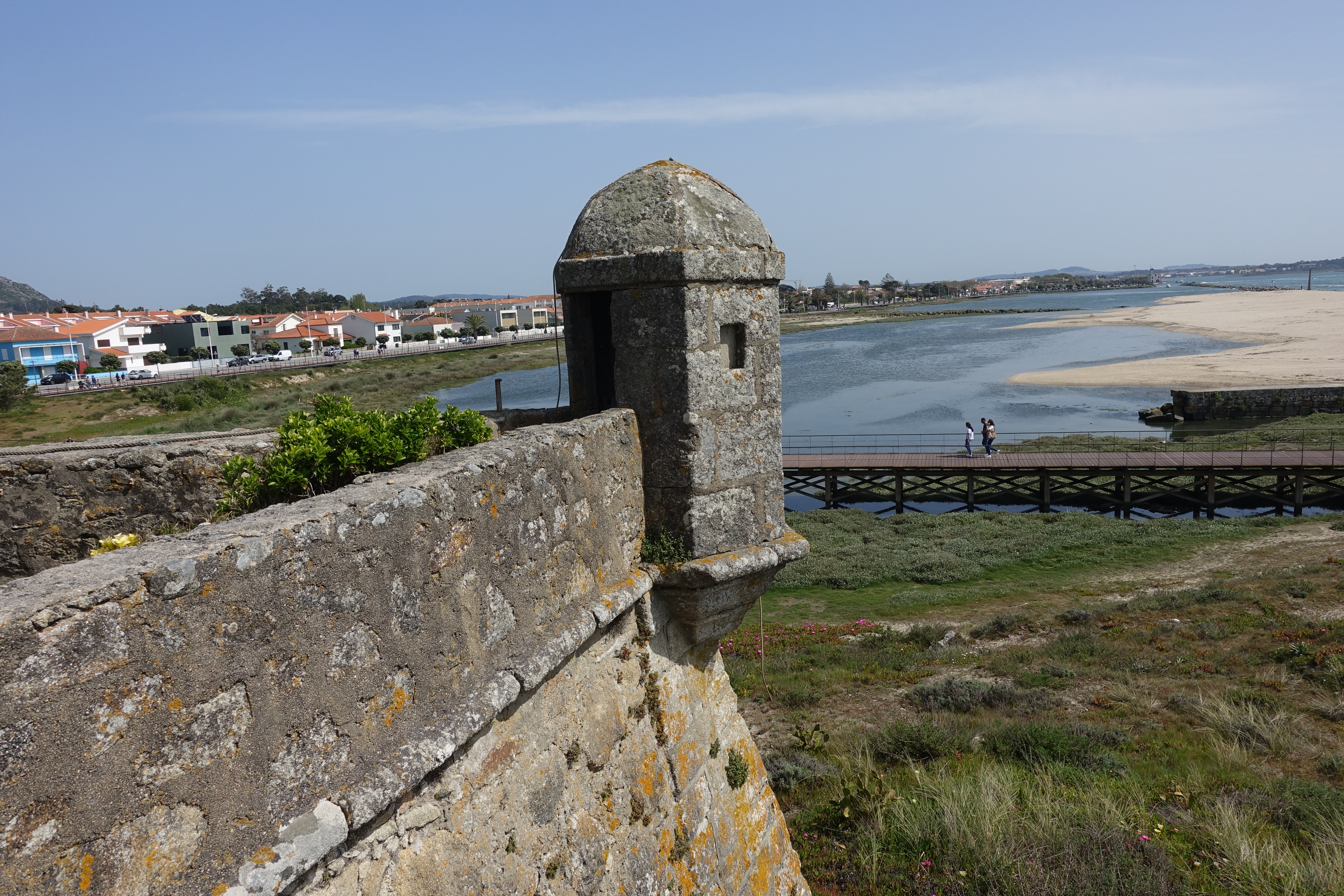
Sentry box overlooking the Cávado.

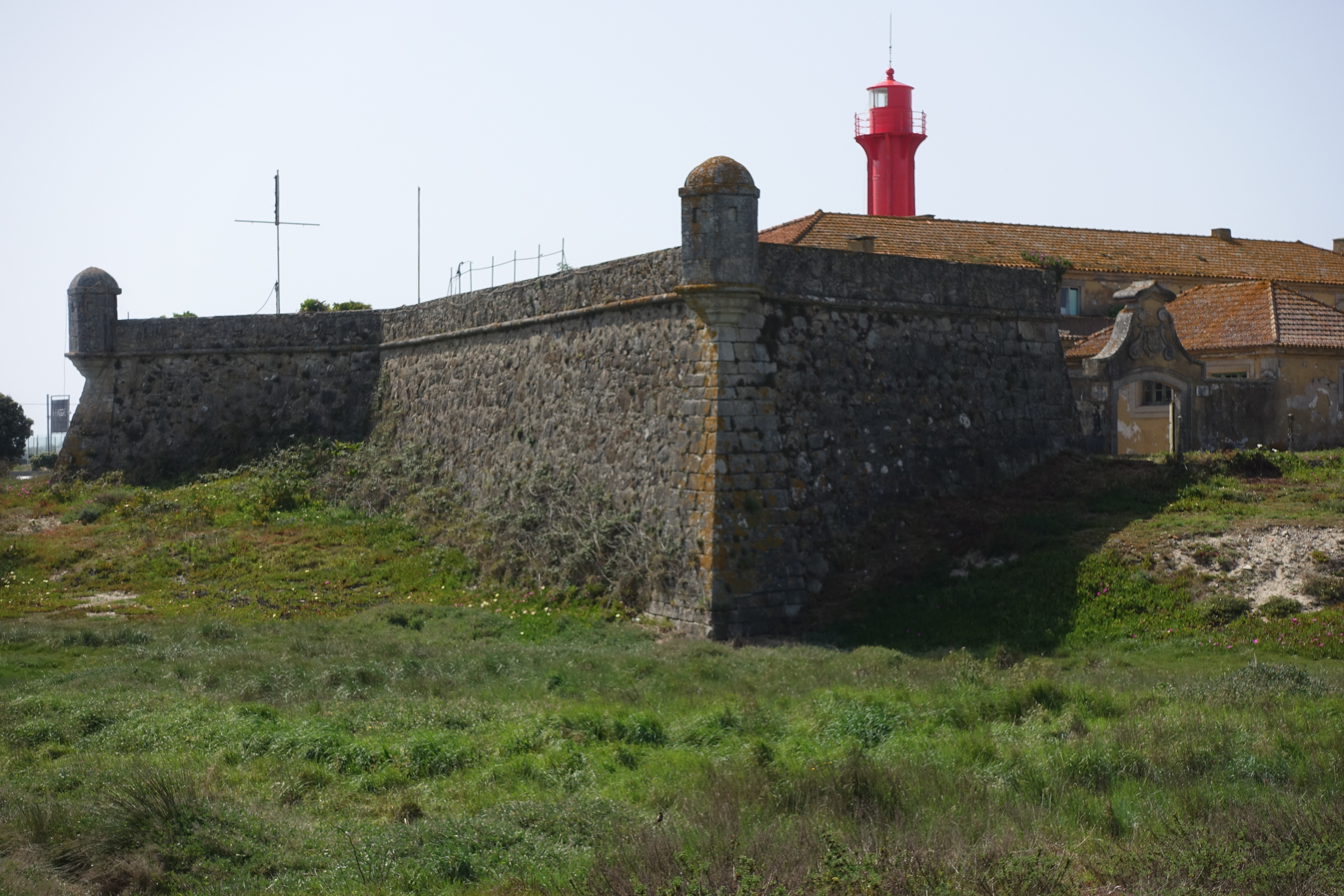
Side view.

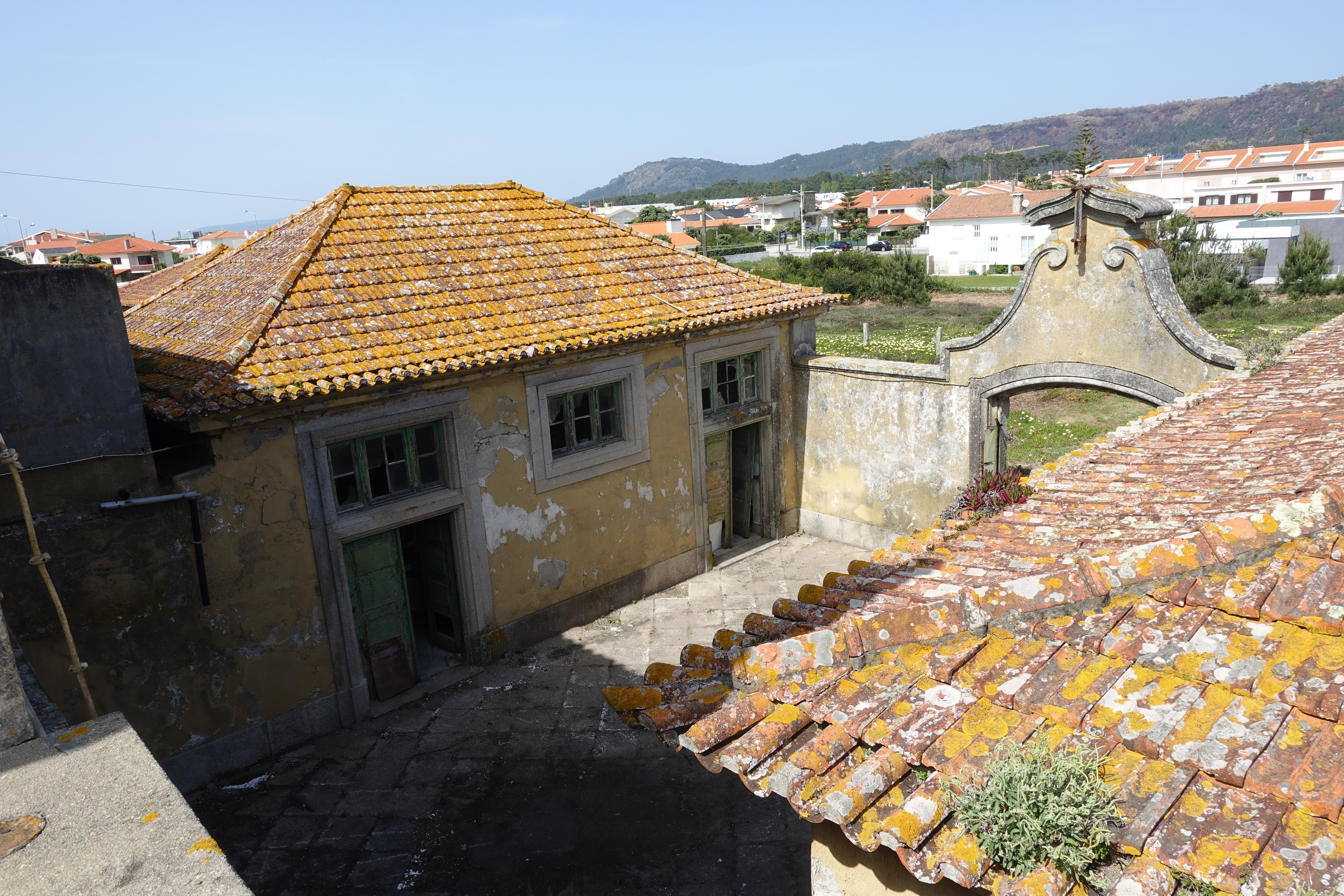
Gateway.

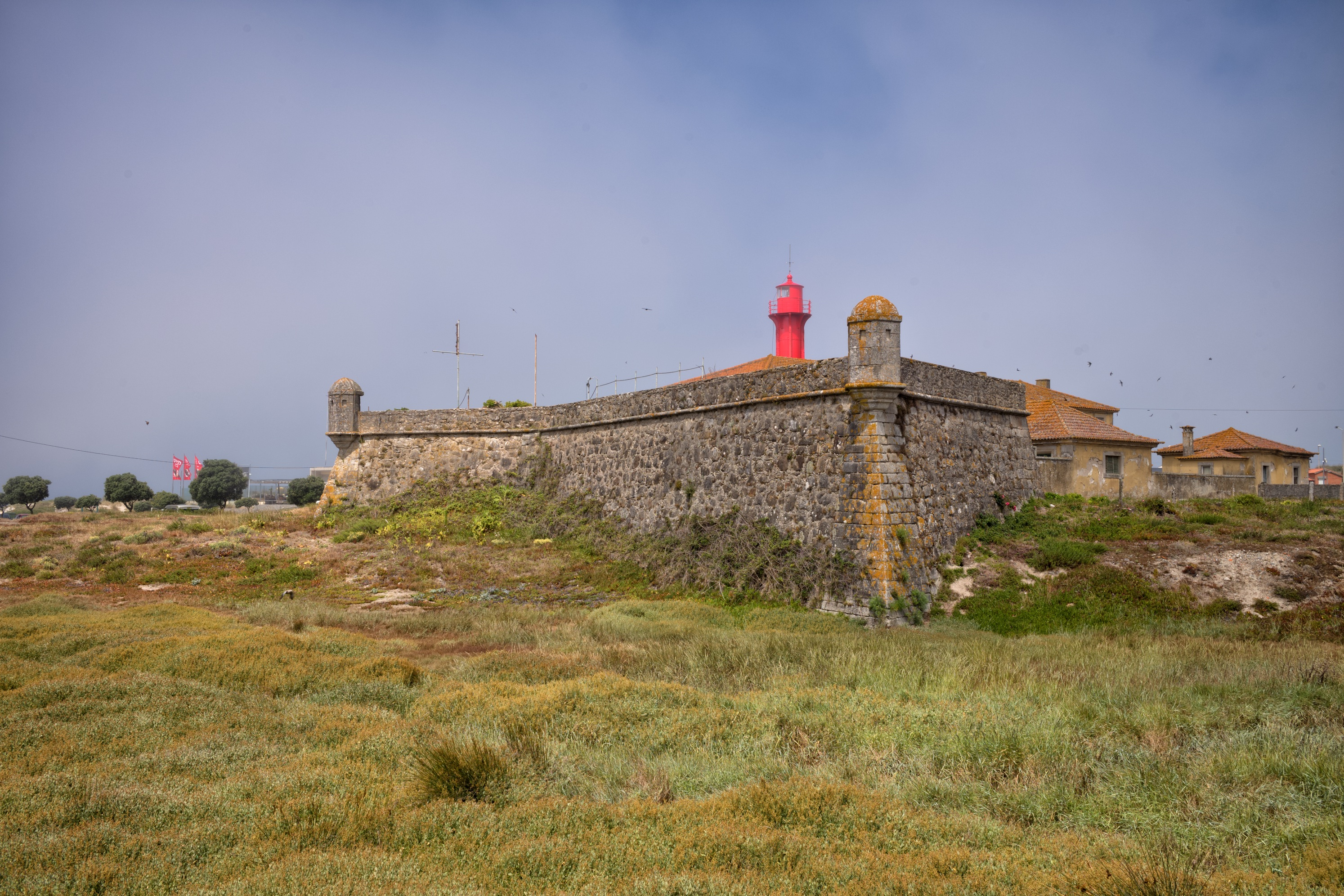

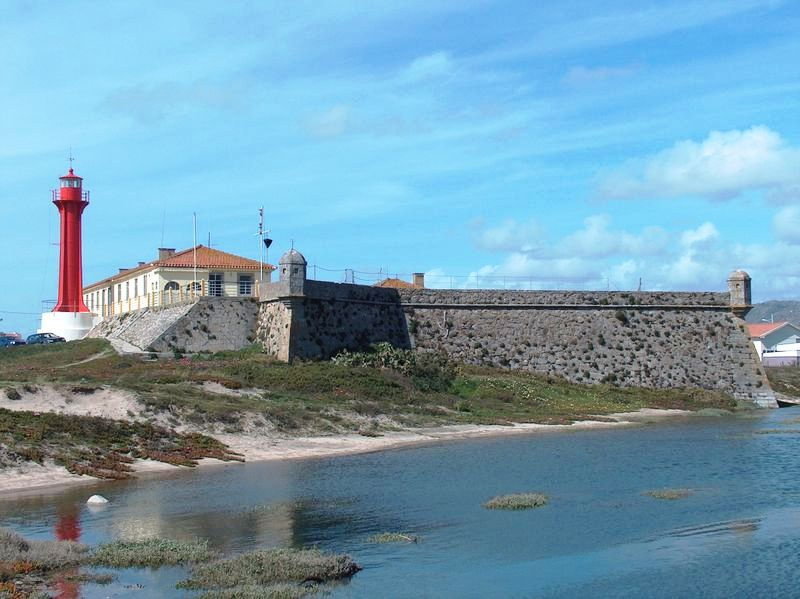
View from the river.

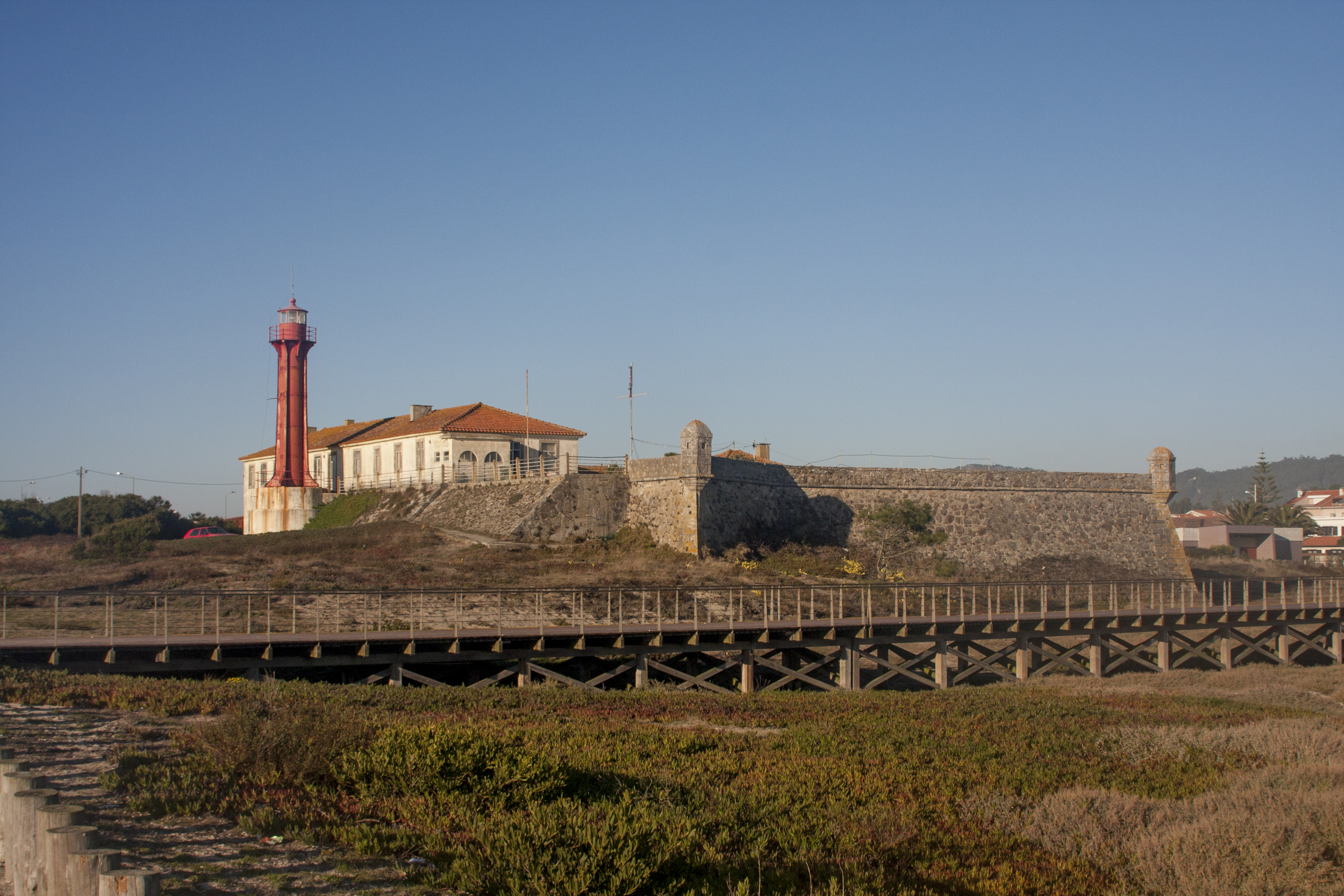
Far view
