= Gandra (Esposende) =

Coordinates: 41°31′23″N 8°45′35″W

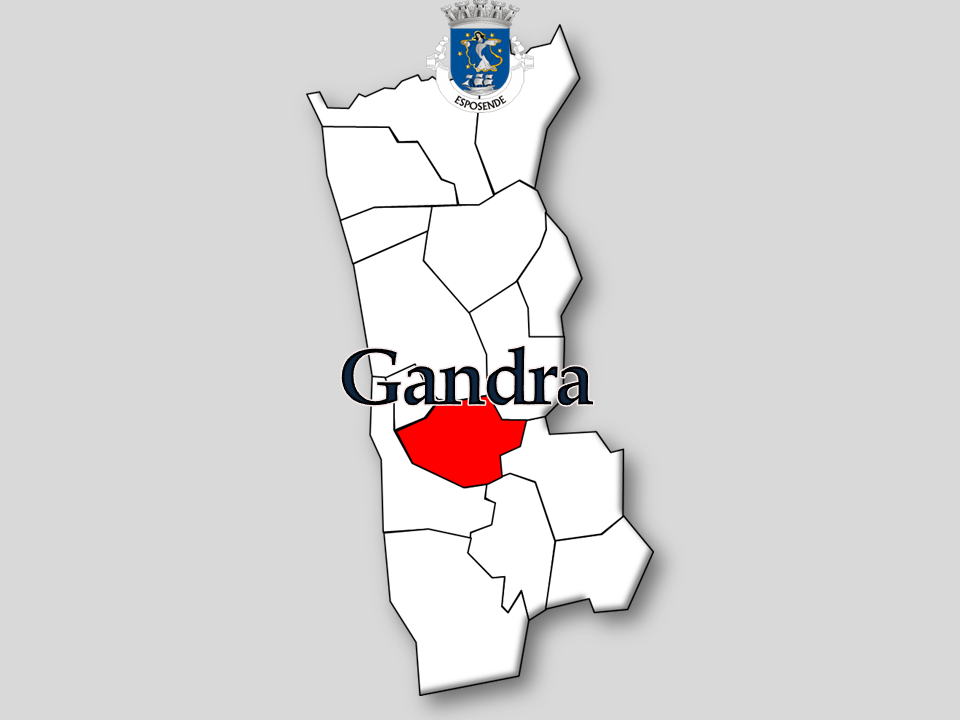
Location of Gandra

Gandra is a former civil parish in the municipality of Esposende, Portugal. In 2013, the parish merged into the new parish Esposende, Marinhas e Gandra. It had a population of 1,323 in 2011. A majority of its inhabitants are Roman Catholic. The main source of income in the town is agriculture.
