= Church of Our Lady of Sorrows, Póvoa de Varzim =

Roman Catholic church in Portugal

Coordinates: 41°22′56″N 8°45′31″W

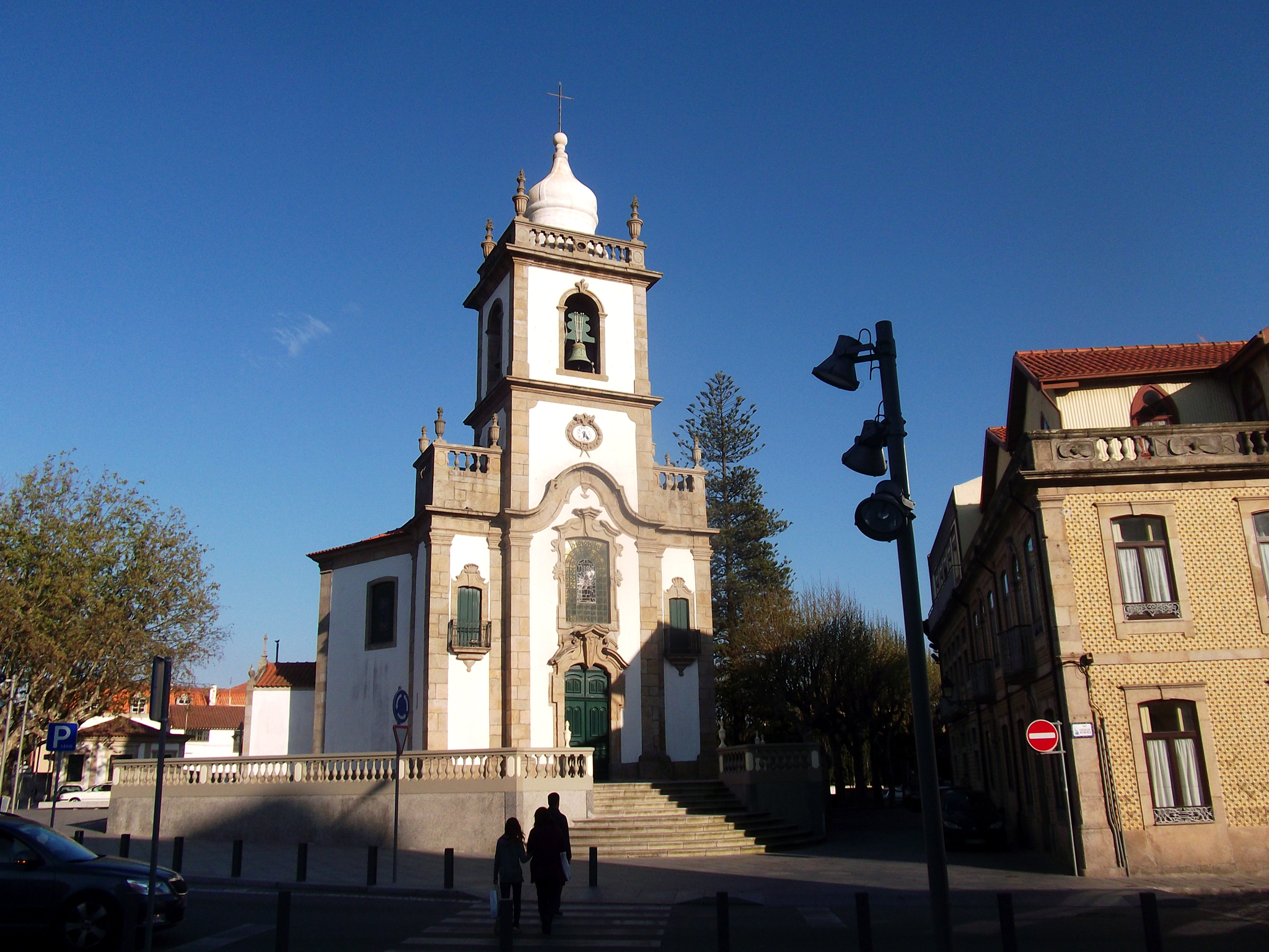
Façade of the Church of Our Lady of Sorrows.

The Church of Our Lady of Sorrows (Portuguese: Igreja de Nossa Senhora das Dores, also referred to as Capela, chapel) is a Roman Catholic church in Póvoa de Varzim, Portugal. It is located in Largo das Dores square, in the old town of Póvoa de Varzim, and is part of the parish of Matriz. The church is dedicated to Our Lady of Sorrows, Nossa Senhora das Dores in Portuguese.

The church was rebuilt in the 18th century. It has sculptures of six of the Seven Sorrows of Mary in six surrounding chapels, and of the seventh sorrow in the altar. It was listed by IGESPAR, the Portuguese national monuments bureau, as a building of public importance in 1974.

== History ==
=== Change in dedication and reconstruction ===
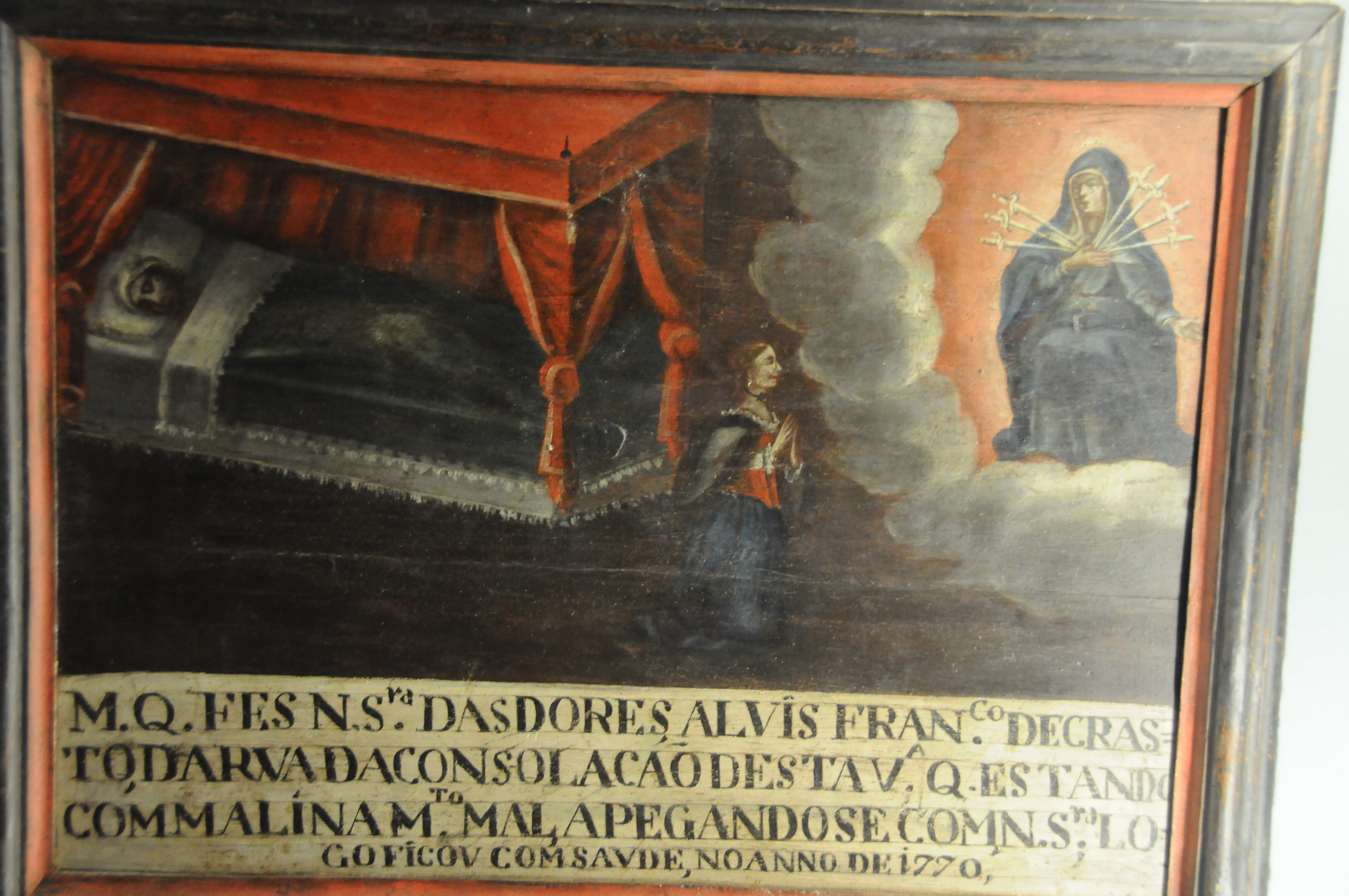
1770 Ex-voto in gratitude to Our Lady of Sorrows due to a healing.

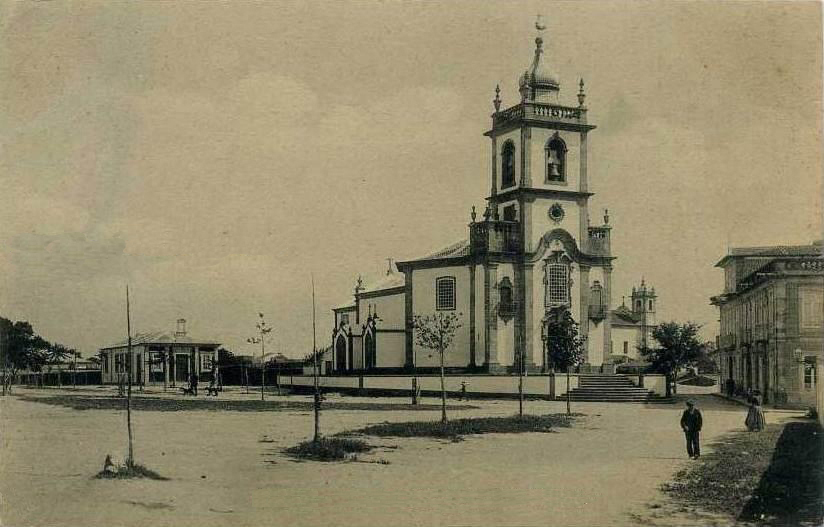
Church of Our Lady of Sorrows in 1906. Former school is to the left.

The Nossa Senhora das Dores church is located on a small hill where, before the 18th century, the Senhor do Monte (Lord of the Hill, the Lord in the crucifix) was celebrated in an ancient chapel.

The change in dedication occurred on July 24 1768 when the archbishop authorized a group of Latin Grammar students from a school in the square near the church to place the icon of Our Lady of Sorrows in the chapel. The students were devotees of Our Lady, and were helped by some inhabitants to achieve that goal. Renovation of the chapel began, and was to continue over a long period of time. The chapel was given the new name of Capela da Virgem Santíssima Senhora das Dores (Chapel of the Most Holy Virgin Lady of Sorrows) and became very popular. The brotherhood had its statutes approved in 1769.

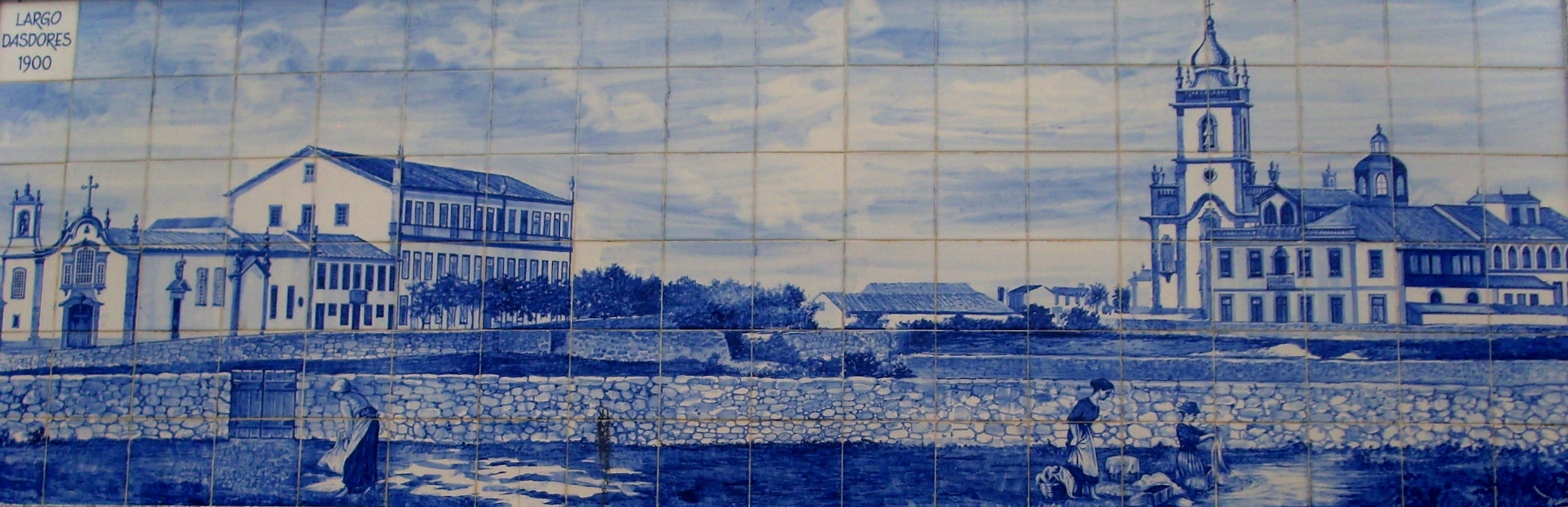
Historical picture of Largo das Dores square. The Church of Our Lady of Sorrows is the one at the right.

An unusual procession took place on June 8, 1784. The icon of our Lady of Sorrows was carried across the square to the icon of Jesus Christ, the Lord in the crucifix, of Misericórdia Church on the North of the square. It was hoped that with intervention from Our Lady of Sorrows the rain would fall to make the farmlands productive.

An 1868 description said "the ornaments and paintings of this chapel are in harmony with the plan adopted for the whole church. It has a church organ. It has a large and elegant tower that is seen from great distance at sea," and "it serves as a reference to seafarers when docking at the beach." The six small chapels were built in 1886 and Our Lady of Sorrows iconography was completed.

In the first half of the 20th century, at a time when the chapel did not even have a Sunday Mass, the Priest José Cascão assisted in making it an active Marian center.

=== Annual festival ===
In earlier times the procession dedicated to Our Lady of Sorrows had taken place on the last Sunday of August. Since early in the 20th century, the procession and the feast were moved to mid-September. The traditional procession goes through old streets and squares: Rua Fernando Barbosa street, Rua do Visconde de Azevedo, Largo Eça de Queirós, Praça do Almada, Praça da República, Rua da Junqueira, Largo David Alves, Passeio Alegre, Avenida dos Banhos, Rua Elias Garcia, Rua António Graça, Avenida Mousinho de Albuquerque, and Largo das Dores square. The festival is one of the most popular in Póvoa de Varzim and in Northern Portugal, and includes a pottery fair (Feira da Louça). It occurs every year in the streets and square around the church.

=== Alexandrina's mystical experiences ===
Alexandrina of Balazar (30 March 1904 – 13 October 1955), declared "Blessed by Pope John Paul II and seen as a saint by the people, said in her memoirs that when she went to the countryside with other girls, she ran from them and picked flowers that she later used to make flower carpets to the Church of Our Lady of Sorrows. When she contemplated the church's altar, with the seventh sorrow of Mary, she was satisfied by the perfume of roses and carnations that decorated it and placed more flowers in the altar, given by her mother.

One day, Alexandrina was terrified and started bleeding from her head and felt her eyes being glued together. She said this was caused by a crown of thorns. Jesus started speaking to her and said "I went through the dark and straight streets of the Calvary like that. Oh, it was a painful walking!". Alexandrina felt her soul filled with light and Jesus called her Alexandrina das Dores (Alexandrina of Sorrows) by saying: "My daughter, my daughter, Alexandrina of mine, Alexandrina of Sorrows: May I grant to you this title of My wife: Alexandrina of Sorrows! May you have the courage!"

== Architecture ==
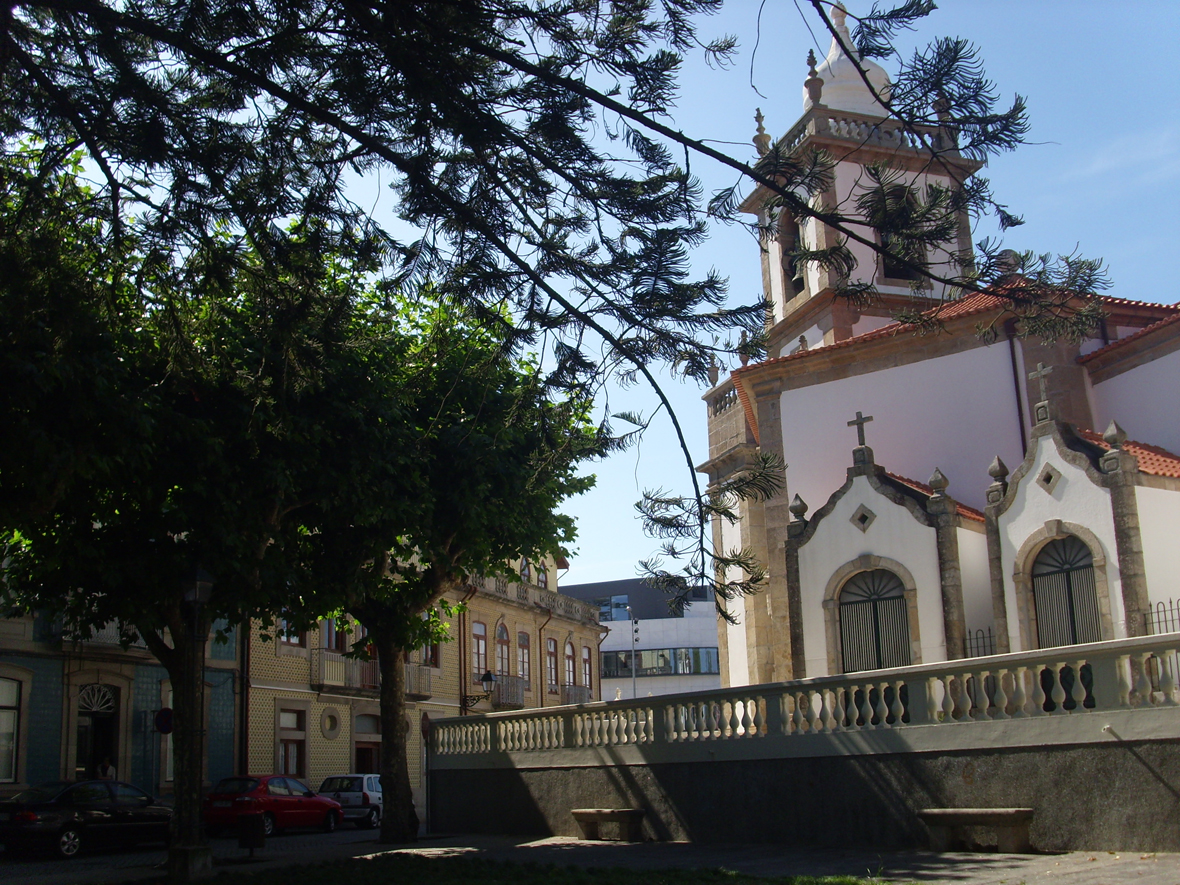
Some of church's chapels as seen from Senhor do Monte street.

Construction of the current church began in 1779, over the old one. It was supervised by the priest José Pedro Baptista, who was a member of the Brotherhood. Work ended a century later, in 1880, when the gilded altarpiece designed by Manuel Alves Couto was installed. There were several difficulties building the church, including financial ones. The original façade was different from the current one, and originally included two towers. These were never completed because architects considered the towers to be too thin. In 1805 an architect from Porto, Joaquim da Costa Lima e Sampaio, suggested a single central tower. The brotherhood accepted the idea only in 1812. It is covered by balustrade and a dome. The bases of the old towers were also covered by balustrade.

In the interior of the church the azulejos (glazed tile panels) in the main chapel are notable and were placed in the 1870s. There are two styles, one using "ponta de diamante" (diamond tip) pattern and another one using a figurative style. In the nave, the chapels surrounding it are in a perfect cycle and the walls are also covered with standard azulejos. The architectural and decorative styles, due to its dynamics, have strong affinities with the Baroque artistic style.
