= Fonte Boa =

Fonte Boa may refer to:

- Fonte Boa, Amazonas, Brazil
- Fonte Boa (parish), Esposende Municipality, Portugal
- Fonte Boa e Rio Tinto, Portugal
