= Largo das Dores =

Square in Póvoa de Varzim, Portugal

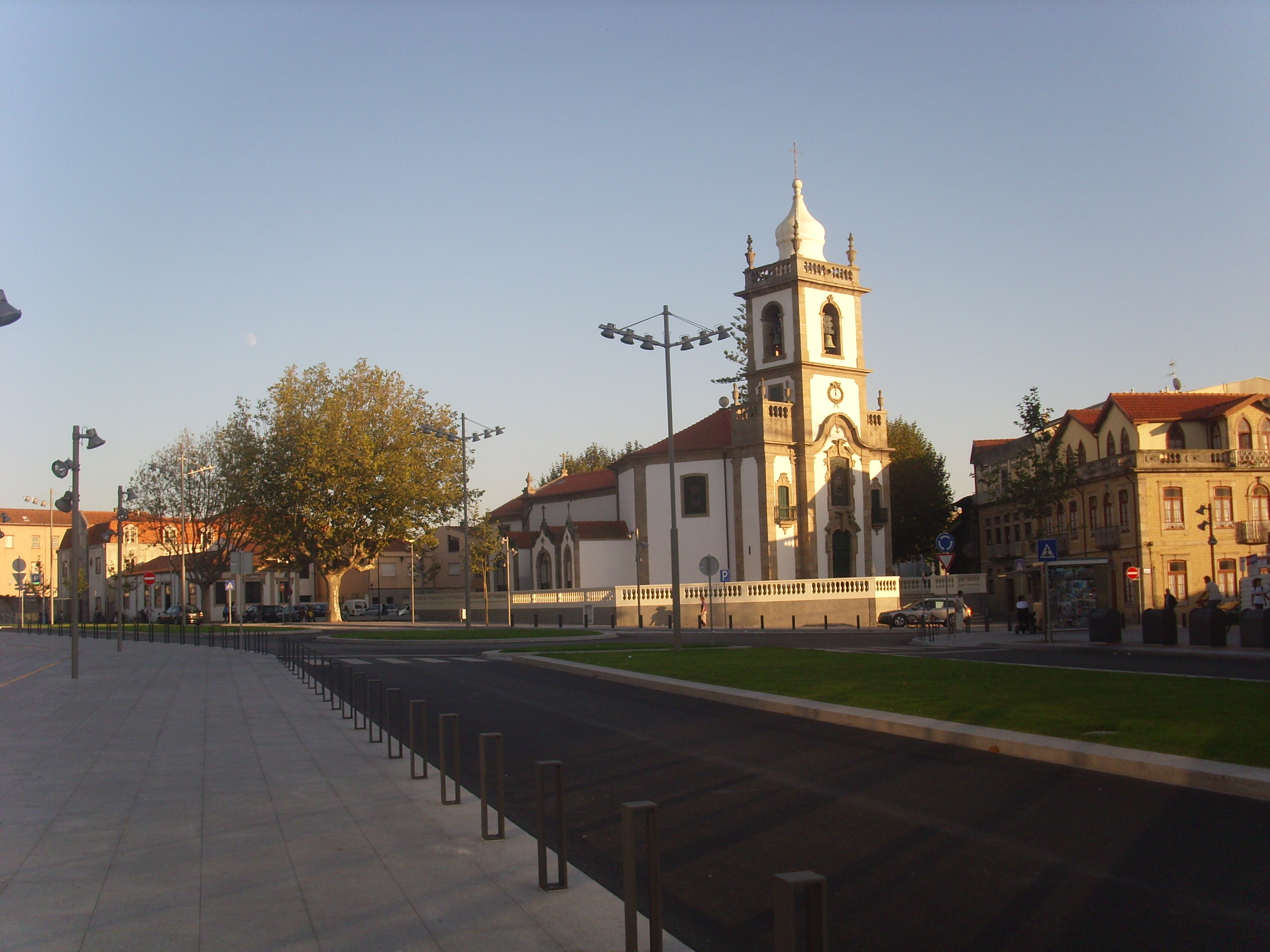
Largo das Dores Square. Senhora das Dores Church.

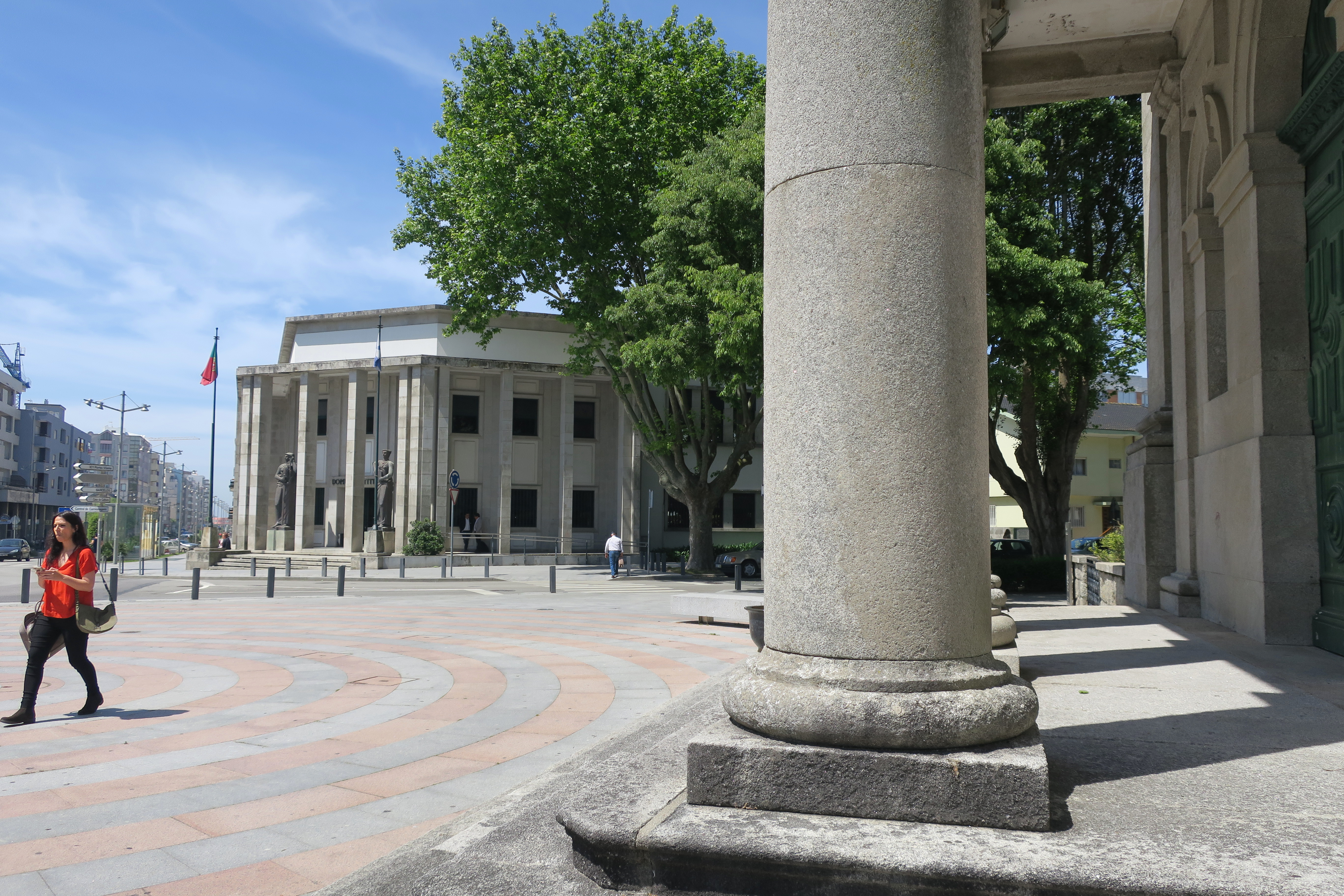
Largo das Dores. Palácio da Justiça.

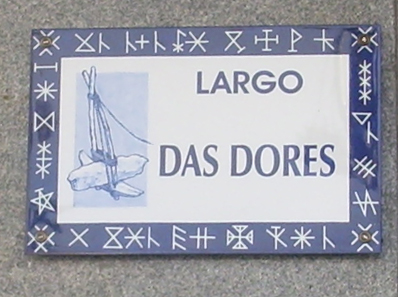
Dores Square plate.

Largo das Dores or Dores Square is a square in Póvoa de Varzim city center in Portugal. Part of the earliest old town (Vila Velha) of Póvoa de Varzim, this area is listed by City Hall as heritage site. With about 11.000 square meters, its most noticeable features are its two churches, located in the sites of ancient chapels, one of which was the main church of the city.

== History ==
=== Roman and Medieval Knights Varzim ===
Dores Square occupies an area, during some periods known as Lugar da Mata, located in Vila Velha - the old town of Varzim. Vila Velha shows traces of having been inhabited since the Roman age, probably dating to the reign of Caesar Augustus; it was probably the original site of the city's first Villa Euracini (Roman villa).

Villa Euracini, then a small town, is referred for the first time in 953. In the Middle Ages, the town's name evolved to Vila Veracin (Town of Varzim). In the 11th century, Henry of Burgundy arrived in Portugal with Guterre Pelayo for the Reconquista. Henry became Count of Portugal and assigned the seaport of Varzim to Guterre Pelayo, and the later became the first Lord of Varzim. It became a powerful fiefdom. With the Portuguese kings disputing the land with the local overlords, the southern area of Vila Veracin became a royal land, where a buffer municipality was established in 1308. The core of Vila Veracin became known as Old town (Vila velha) since 1343.

=== Lady of Varzim Church and the Great Snake ===
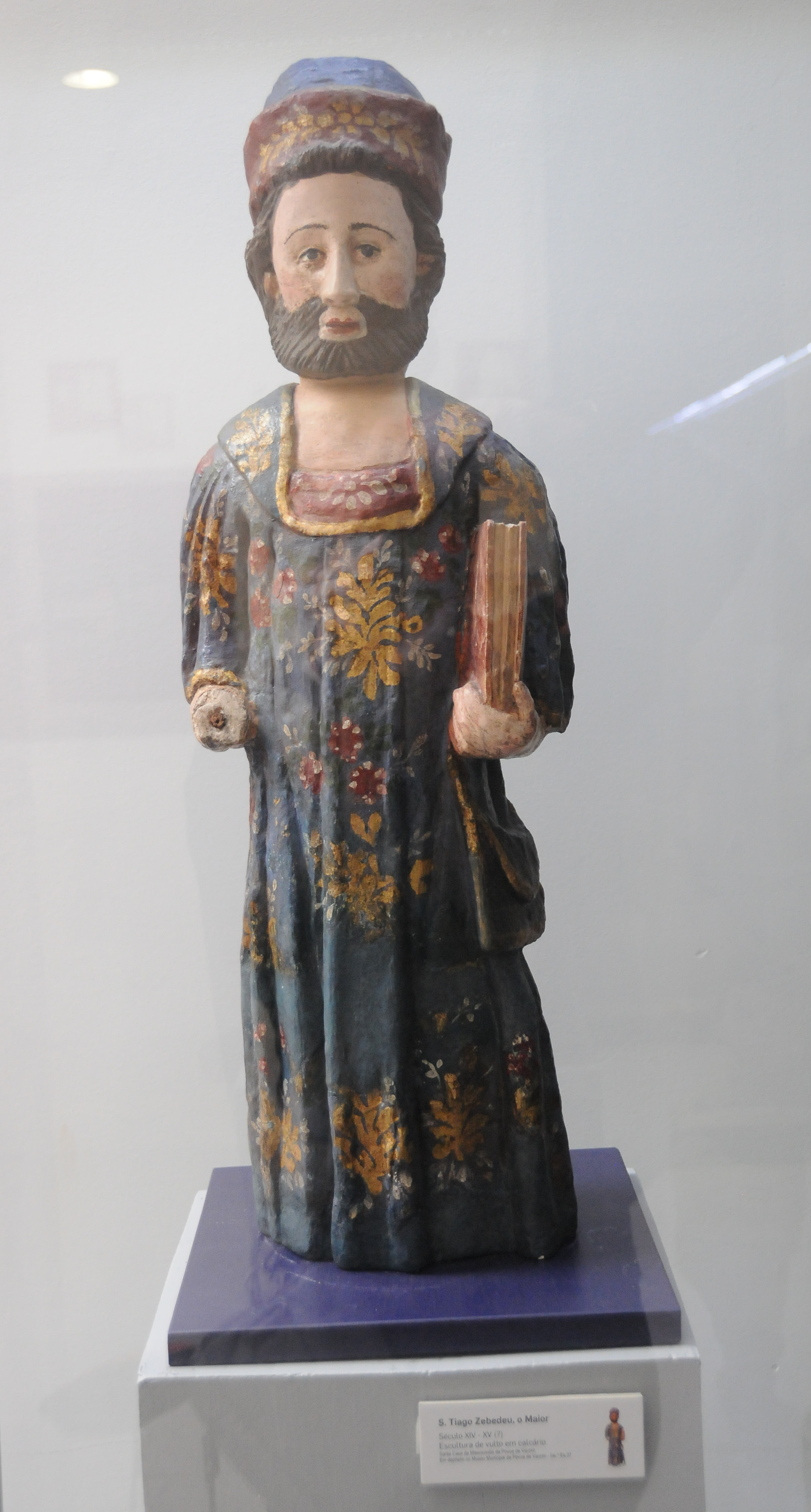
Saint Jaimes icon from the 14th or 15th century found in the site of the church.

In the 11th century the northern section of the square housed a chapel, a Romanesque chapel dedicated to Saint James, son of Zebedee. This Gothic-Romanesque chapel became the Main Church of Póvoa de Varzim in 1456, where Our Lady of Varzim, a 13th-century icon, was being venerated.

The story surrounding the change in invocation is told in The News of the Town of Póvoa de Varzim made on May 24, 1758 by Lieutenant Francisco Felix Henriques da Veiga Leal, in which he says "To the west of Misericordia Churchyard [Senhora de Varzim church] there's a field that the people names "Passadas" (steps) or "Pègadinhas" (little footsteps): it is a tradition that in this place, there are dips in some rocks that they know as "passadas" or "pégadas" (footsteps) in which the miraculous icon of Lady of Varzim appeared (…) The seafarers of this town, also the neighboring peoples, have great faith in Her (…) The Portuguese merchant captains of this region passing by this coast they fire a gun salute from their ships. They say that after her apparition they placed her in Madre Deus Chapel, which was within the town, and in the next day the icon was missing; they found it in the same rocky place in which it appeared for the first time. They say that this place of Misericordia church there was a parish chapel, and they say with the invocation of Saint James, not very popular because it had close to it bushes in which several poisonous animals were seen, especially a large snake".

Lugar da Mata despite being out of the urban core of Póvoa de Varzim, was very busy because it was at a crossroad between several ways, namely the road between Vila do Conde and Esposende, that crossed in there with the ways that arrived from Giesteira and other suburbs.

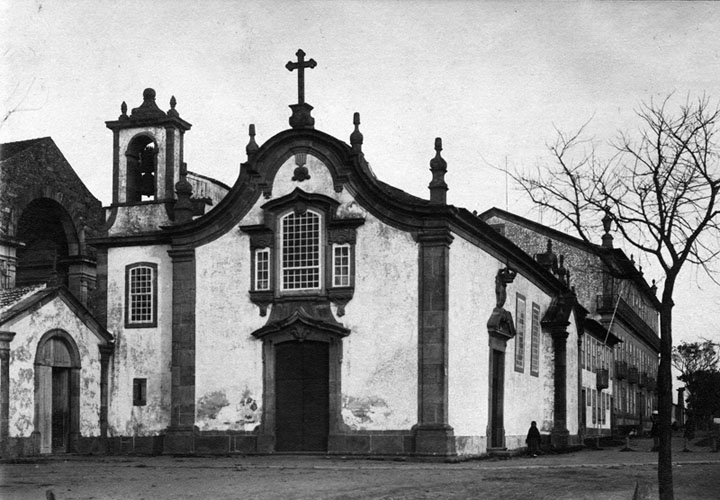
Senhora de Varzim church as it was before being demolished in 1910.

The church was known to have the icon of a snake, destroyed during the 18th century church improvements. The people associated this serpent icon, typically Romanesque, with the legend of Our Lady of Varzim icon. The traditional Póvoa de Varzim Easter ceremonies appeared in April 1687 in the First Church, due to António Cardia, the chief pilot of the Portuguese armada, and his daughter.

=== Old town decline in the 18th century ===
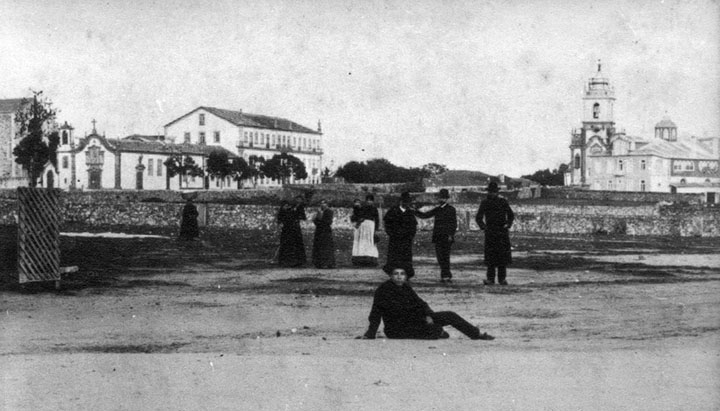
Largo das Dores as seen from nearby farmfields.

In the 18th century, Póvoa was expanding, and Santa Maria de Varzim Church proved to be too small for such a large and growing community and was not in the civic center of the time. A new main church was blessed in 1757 in Praça Velha. The church became known as Misericordia Church, due to a devotee from the old town, Maria Fernandes, widow of Manuel Francisco Maio, that left all her wealth to create, in the old first church, the Misericórdia Brotherhood in 1756, reuniting with it, the Passos Brotherhood, that already existed in the temple, by this deed the Santa Casa da Misericórdia of Póvoa de Varzim was created. The old town's population loss was such that, by the mid-18th century, there were only four houses surrounded by farmed fields.

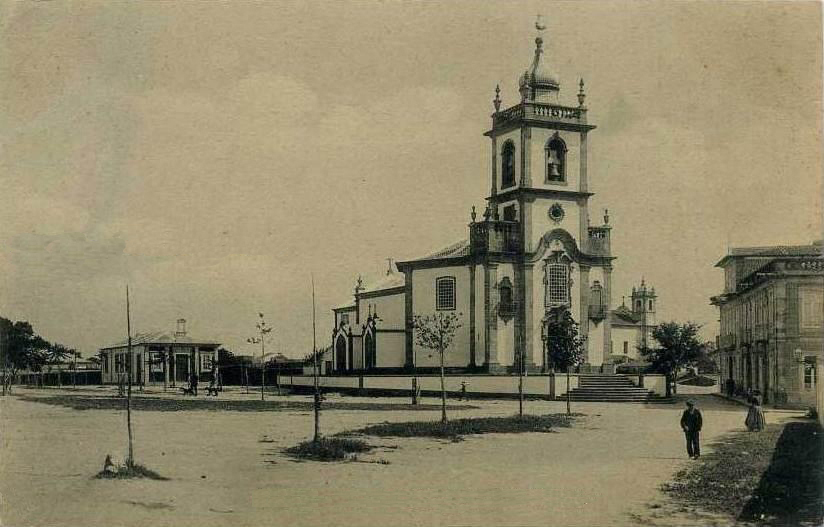
Senhora das Dores church in 1906. Former school (currently a police station) is to the left.

Senhora das Dores Church, from where the square's name derives, in found in front of the old main church, in a small hill where previously the Senhor do Monte (Lord of the Hill) was venerated in another ancient small chapel. The change in invocation occurred on July 24, 1768, when the archbishop authorized the placement of a Senhora das Dores icon in the chapel to a group of devotee Latin Grammar students, they were helped by some residents. From then on, the temple was significantly changed for a long period ending in the 19th century when the six chapels were built.

On June 8, 1784 a curious procession is registered in Dores Square in which the icon of Senhora das Dores is taken to Nosso Senhor Jesus Cristo Crucificado in the Misericórdia Church, that by Senhora das Dores intervention, the rain may fall for the lands to be productive. Misericórdia Church, was demolished in 1910 because it was almost in ruins, the lack of architectural grandeur and the expansion of the new beach district's Mouzinho de Albuquerque Avenue. Near the old church, the new Misericórdia Church started being built one year prior to the demolition. Stones with historical or artistic value, such as the Gothic-Romanesque door and signed stones where carefully saved and stored in the City's museum.

=== The 1811 Famine and the modern period ===
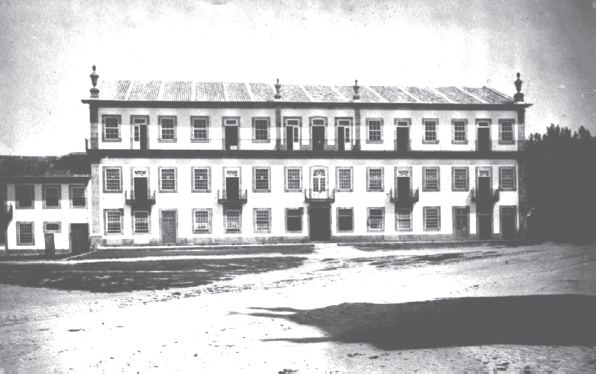
Póvoa de Varzim Hospital in the 19th century.

The harsh long winter of 1811 provoked the 1811 Famine amongst the fishermen and the epidemic that followed it., which led the city hall to obtain a license for the establishment of a provisional hospital in a city hall room in that year. But the room could not substitute a true hospital. City Hall asked King John VI the definitive establishment of a hospital in town and to look for available land where it would be built. The plea was well received, and there were orders for the project to start in 1819. Only in 1826, seven year on, that the construction works started due to efforts by José António Alves Anjo and other Povoans. The hospital, built behind the old First Church, opened to the public on June 29, 1835.

In 1866, to the east of the hospital, the first cemetery out of churchyards was created, in the place of the old prison, this finally ended the tradition of burial of the deceased inside churches and its yards, especially in the old main Church.

Because it was a square in a strategic location in relation to the city and the surrounding countryside, at Wednesday, Dores square had the "Wood Fair". This busy market ended in the early 1930s. It started at sunrise, when farmers brought pine-wood pieces in their peculiar carts pulled by bulls. The wood was used for preparing meals by housewives, hotels, restaurants and bakeries.

== Urban morphology ==
The new Misericórdia Church (1914) and the Senhora das Dores Church (rebuilt in the 18th century) limit the west side of the square by the north and south, respectively. Misericórdia Church has neoclassical and baroque elements, an eclectic building by architect Adães Bermudes; while Senhora das Dores Church has a Baroque style. The square has public health structure of regional relevance: the Hospital Center of Póvoa de Varzim/Vila do Conde and the Centro de Diagnóstico Pneumológico da Póvoa. The hospital is a rectangular building with two floors and plain architecture, but very large for early 19th century Póvoa. The current Hispano-Moresque azulejo tilework in the façade were added when the building was expanded in the late 19th century.

Palácio da Justiça (1965), where the Judicial Court of Póvoa de Varzim is located, is a construction with an Estado Novo architectural style by Raul Rodrigues Lima, between the pillars hall the statues of João Feyo are found, one representing Law and the other right. The statues were placed in order to please the population that disliked the building because it was not monumental for them. The palace has in its hearing room a fresco that invokes the delivery of the royal charter to Póvoa de Varzim by King Denis, work by master Augusto Gomes. In front of the palace, the Millennium Mark of March 26, 953 marks the date when Póvoa de Varzim appears for the first time in a known written document with its Latin name Villa Euracini.

There's also the GNR republican guard that patrols the countryside of the municipality and the municipal 1925 building in the place of the old Póvoa de Varzim Prison. To the east, the square ends in Sagrado Coração de Jesus College, that belonged to the Dorothean sisters, today controlled by Póvoa de Varzim's Matriz Parish. Santa Casa Museum of Póvoa de Varzim is a museum with a religious theme located in Santa Casa da Misericórdia complex.

Urban morphology

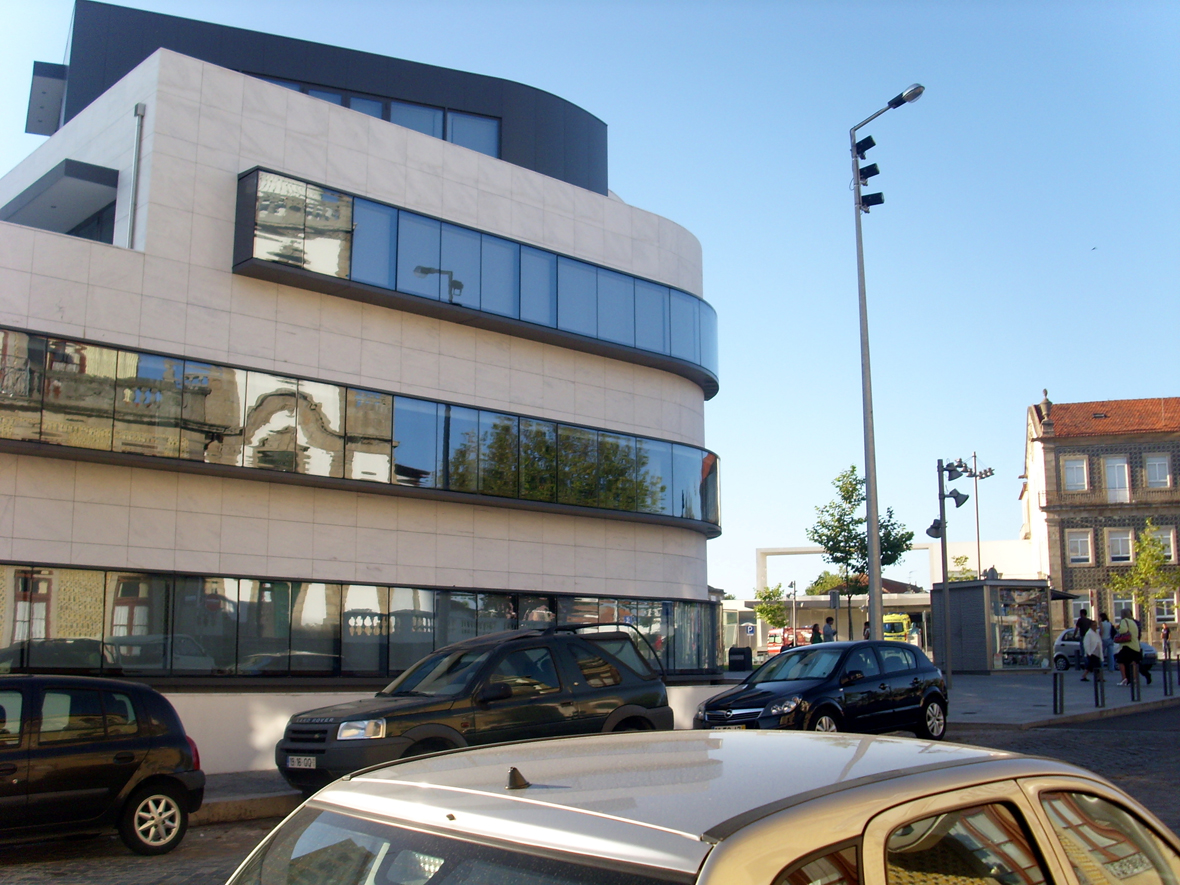
Headquarters of the CA Bank of Póvoa de Varzim, Vila do Conde and Esposende.

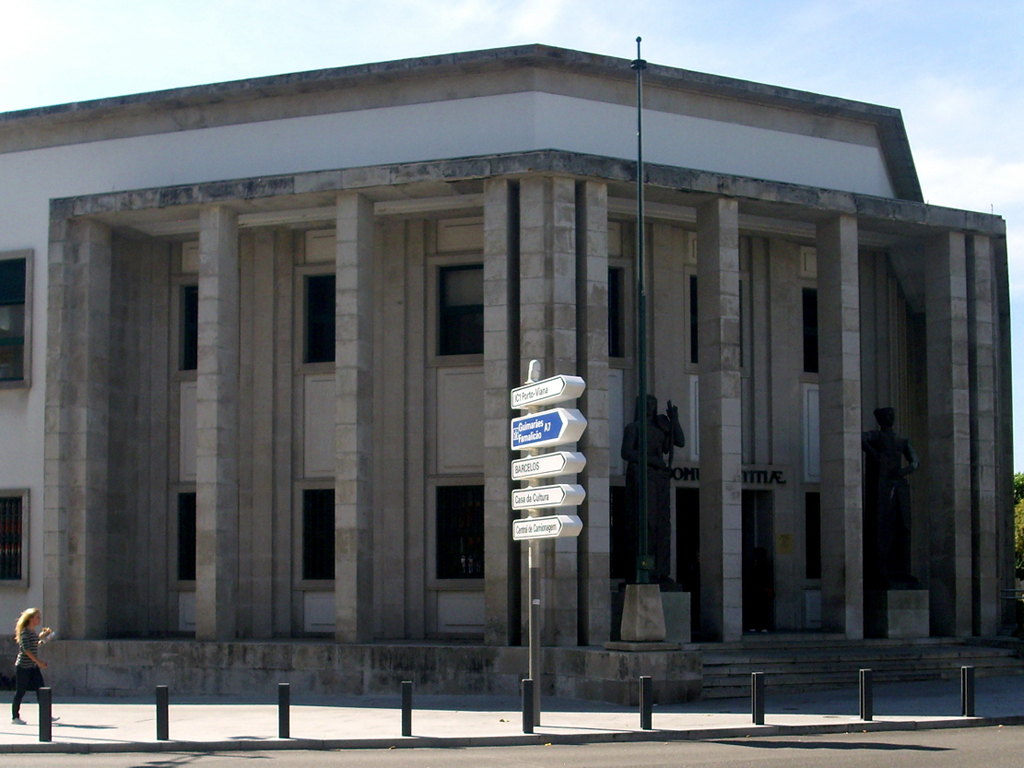
The Palace of Justice was built using New State style.

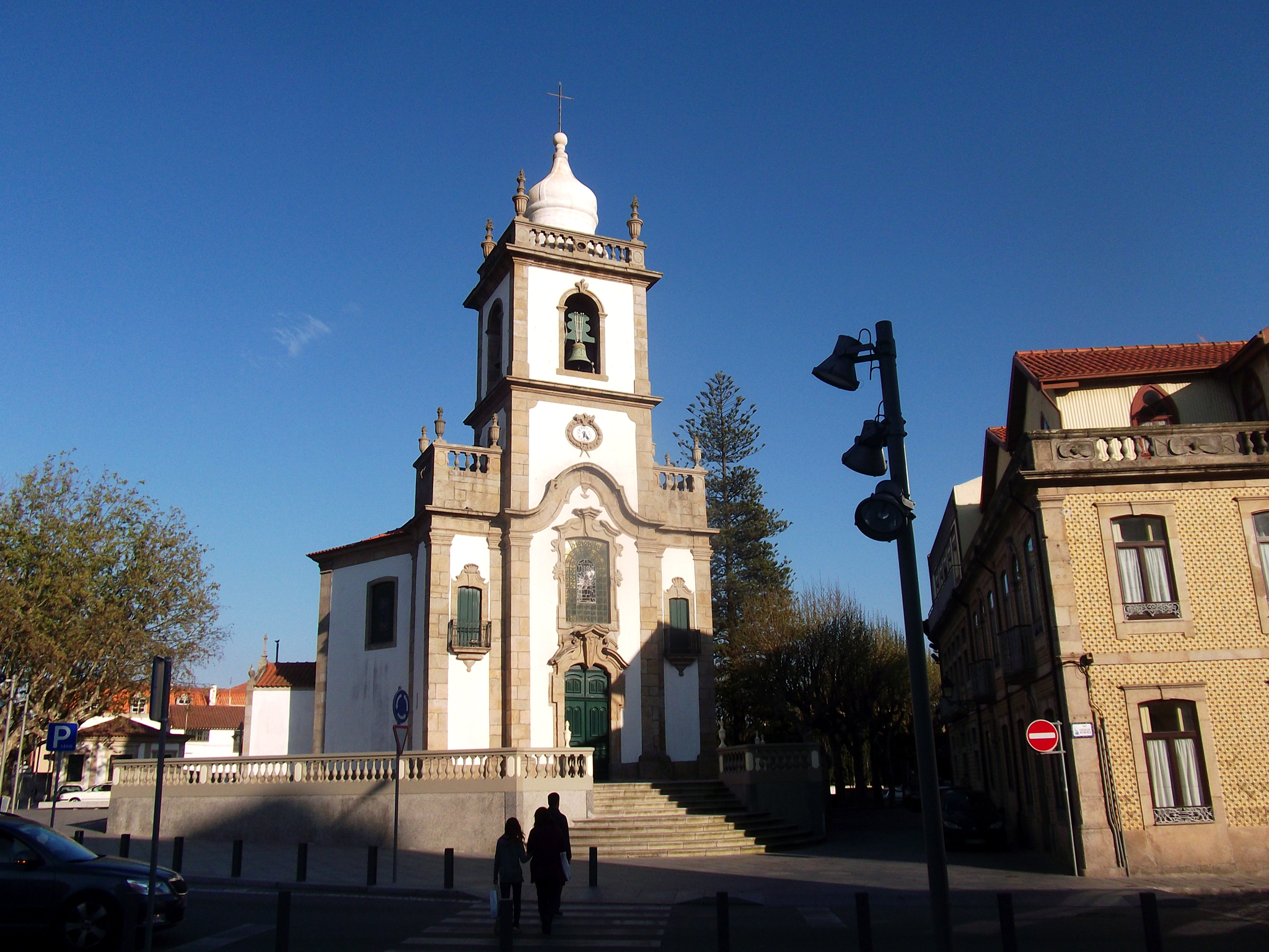
Senhora das Dores Church

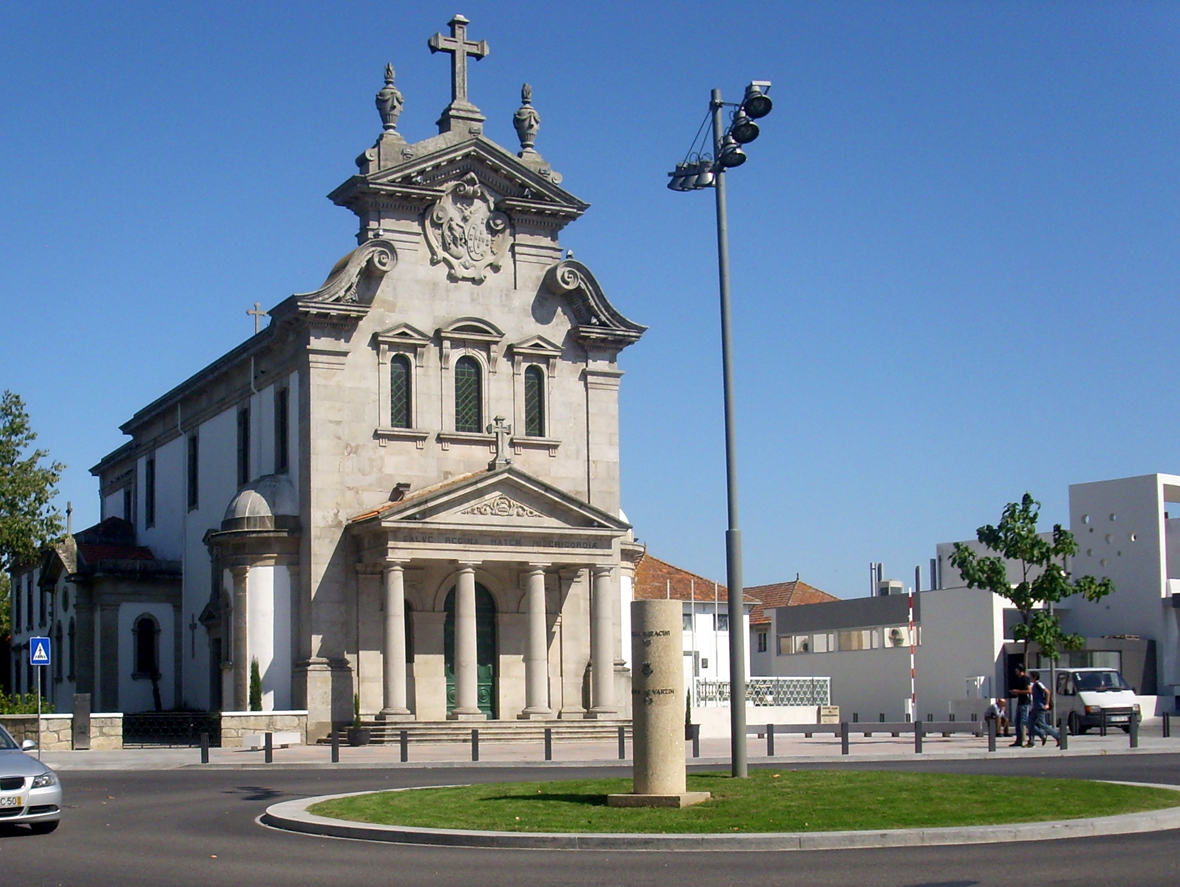
Villa Euracini Millenium Mark and the eclectic Misericórdia Church

=== Listed heritage ===
- Dores Square (open area with patrimonial relevance)
- Palácio da Justiça (Palace of Justice, court)
- Misericórdia Church
- Nossa Senhora das Dores Church
- Misericórdia Hospital(Hospital Center of Póvoa de Varzim/Vila do Conde)
- Old Count Ferreira School (GNR police station)
- Sagrado Coração de Jesus College (primary school)
- Hospital Fountain
