= Santa Casa Museum of Póvoa de Varzim =

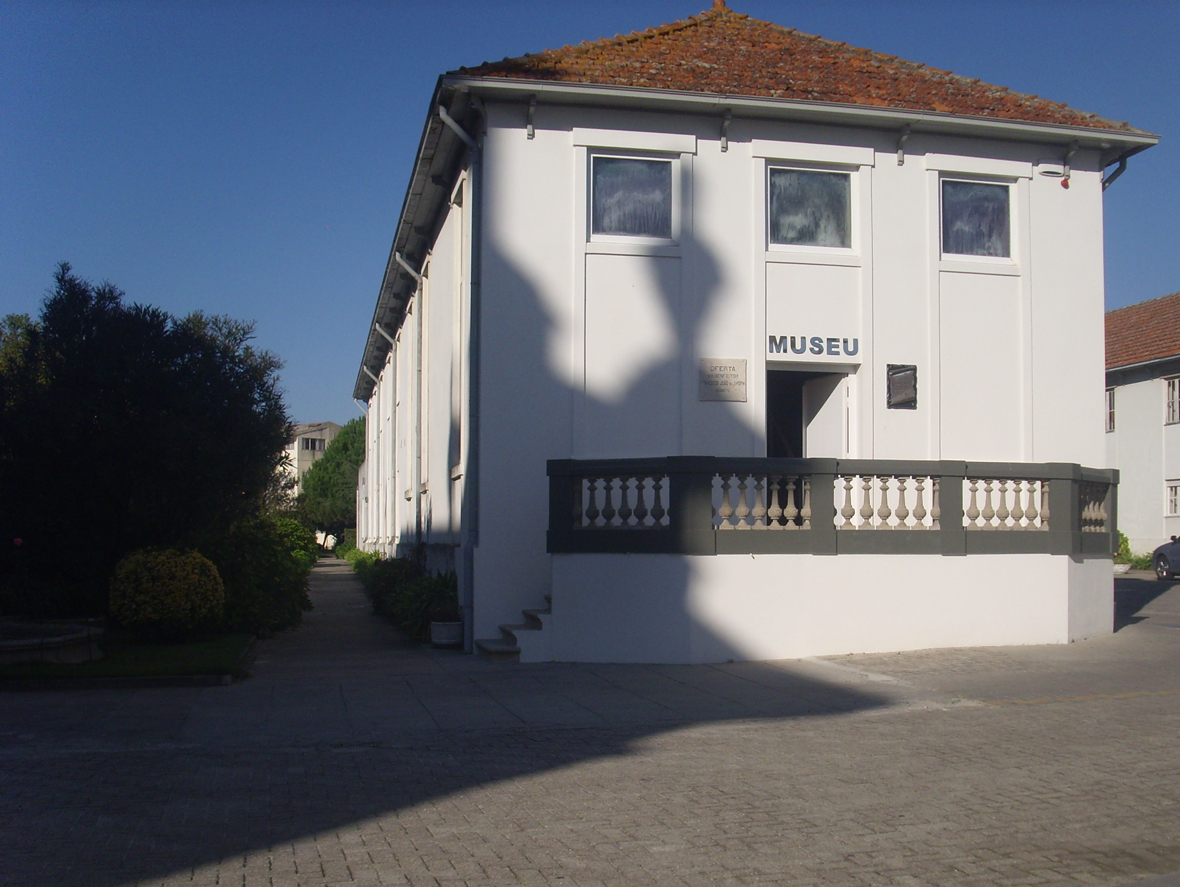
Museu da Santa Casa.

Santa Casa Museum of Póvoa de Varzim (Portuguese: Museu da Santa Casa da Misericórdia da Póvoa de Varzim or simply Museu da Santa Casa or Museu da Misericórdia) is a museum with a religious theme located in Póvoa de Varzim, Portugal.

The museum is located in Santa Casa da Misericórdia complex in Largo das Dores.

The museum's collection includes Pietà, a 16th-century Mannerist oil painting from the School of Luis de Morales, c. 1520–1586, Spain, with Italian and Flemish influences, the Ex-voto Senhor da Prisão (1817 painting from the ancient church of Misericórdia, the early main church of Póvoa de Varzim) and an icon of Saint Anthony of Padua or Lisbon (16th or 17th century), distinct from the common iconography. The icon of Saint Anthony of the museum is considered more accurate as it follows the description of a chronicler from Padua.
