= Matriz Church of Póvoa de Varzim =

Coordinates: 41°22′51.29″N 8°45′24.97″W

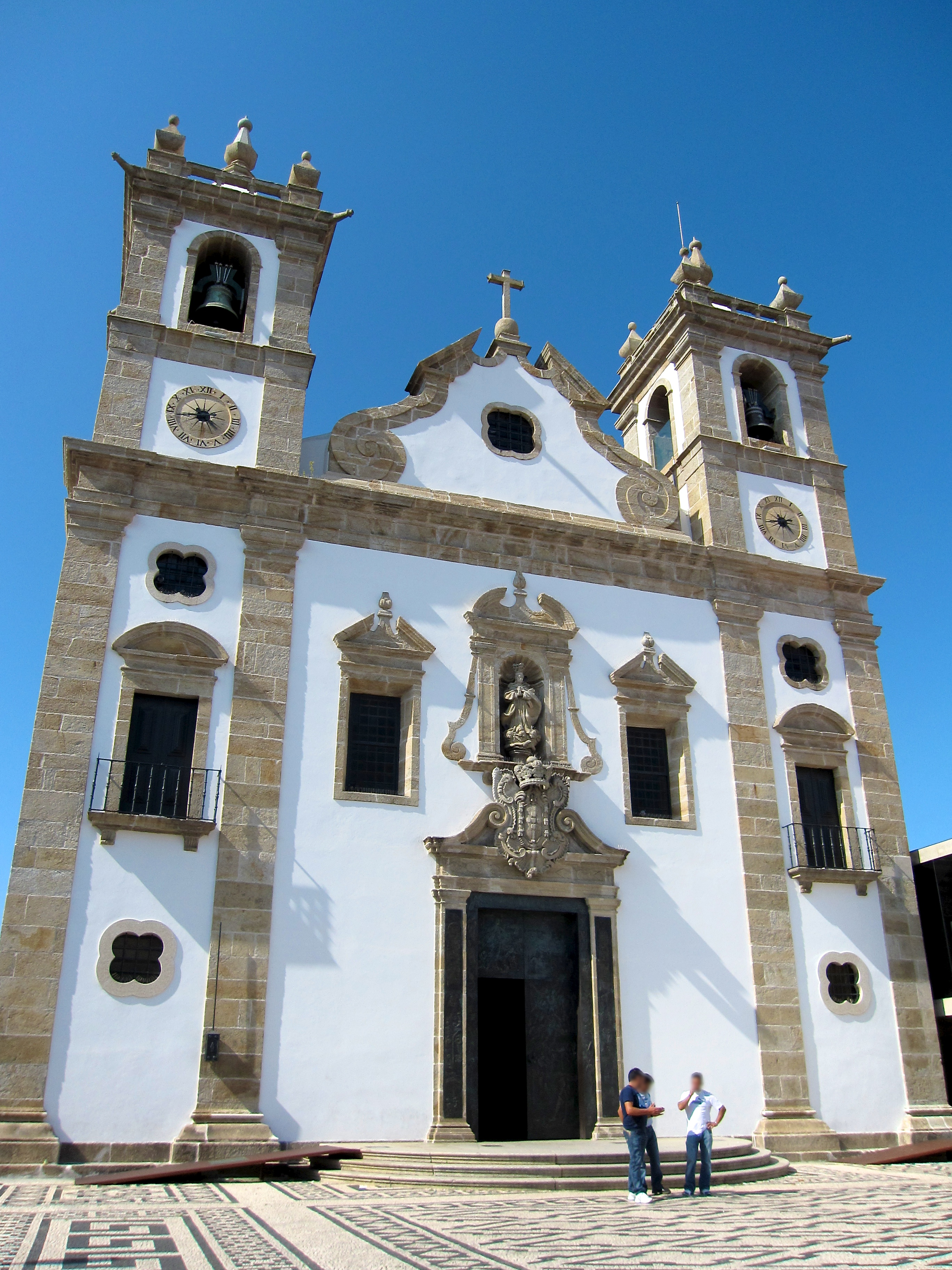
Façade of Matriz church.

Matriz Church of Póvoa de Varzim (Portuguese: Igreja Matriz da Póvoa de Varzim, literally Mother Church of Póvoa de Varzim), also Nossa Senhora da Conceição Parish Church is the Mother Roman Catholic church in Póvoa de Varzim, Portugal. The temple is located in Praça Velha square, in Bairro da Matriz quarter. The church is dedicated to the Our Lady of the Immaculate Conception, Nossa Senhora da Conceição in Portuguese, the main patron saint of Póvoa de Varzim.

Of Baroque architecture and of high artistic value, the temple was built in the 18th century siding the old Póvoa de Varzim town hall, a proof of the alliance of Póvoa de Varzim Town Hall with the Archdiocese of Braga, important for the territorial disputes that the town had with the House of Braganza.

== History ==
=== Early temples ===
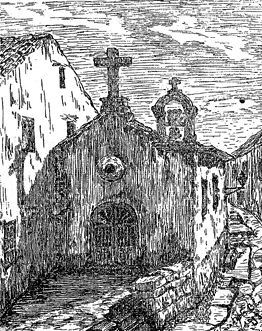
The 16th century Madre de Deus Chapel.

There was a chapel around Praça Velha square, known as Madre de Deus chapel, built before 1521 by the nobleman João Gomes Gaio, father of the knight João Martins Gaio, the later was related with the maritime trade of Vila do Conde. By being established in Póvoa civic center he could easily recruit men for seafaring activities. This noble family was responsible for the benefits Póvoa gained during this period.

Madre de Deus Chapel gained a tabernacle in 1544, when the Ordinary Judge, the town's councilmen and people asked Braga archbishop, which established the Corpus Christi procession in Póvoa de Varzim, to where the clergymen of Beiriz, Amorim, Terroso and Estela were obliged to participate since 1591 and the ones from Laundos, Navais and Argivai, since 1625. The growing regional influence led Vila do Conde to protest in 1637. Regarding civil administration, all these parishes were integrated in Póvoa de Varzim only in the 19th century.

Because Madre de Deus chapel was located in the civic center, it was more popular than the mother church of Póvoa de Varzim, the ancient Senhora de Varzim Church, established in the 11th century, in Póvoa de Varzim Old Town. The Lady of Varzim icon was a medieval representation of Mary with Baby Jesus. The Parish of Santa Maria of Póvoa de Varzim was referred, for the first time, in a registry from 1456. Until then Póvoa de Varzim was integrated in the São Miguel-o-Anjo Parish of Argivai, despite the existence of the chapel.

=== A new main church ===
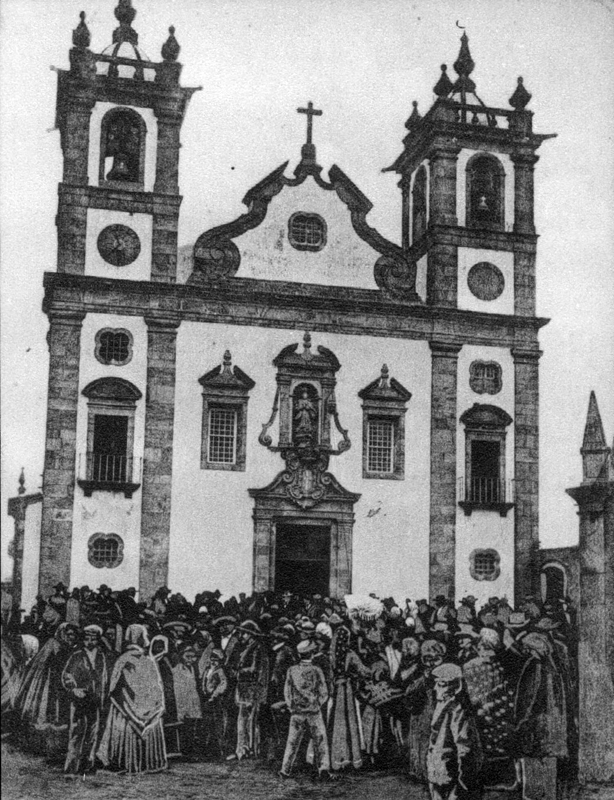
An early picture of the new main church.

The church of Santa Maria de Varzim, the mother church was located in the old town, and was, in the 18th century, outside of Póvoa de Varzim's civic center. The ancient Santa Maria de Varzim Church was also too small for such a large population. The Povoan Senate (Senado Poveiro) asked the King a larger temple. King John V answered with the royal provision of June 1, 1736, granting the leftovers of taxes for 15 years and the population had to contribute with one Real in the meat and wine.

The temple was built in the town hall's square, showing an alliance between the town hall and the Archdiocese of Braga, that was useful for the territorial disputes that the town had with Barcelos, controlled by the House of Braganza. The town hall was part of the commission that built the church, has contributed with the maintenance and improvement of the first church, and the construction of the new one, as such it had special privileges granted by Braga archbishops. The judge of the town hall was also judge of the church, granting power to areas outside the civil borders established in the 16th century and disputed with the House of Braganza. In 1610, these privileges were already a tradition that had to be respected by the archdiocese's hierarchy, even if these were against rulings.

Works started when, in a ceremony, the priest Carvalho da Cunha placed the first stone on February 18, 1743. The stone was taken into place by four local personalities: Sir Diogo de Sousa, Gonçalo de Almeida de Sousa, lieutenant Veiga Leal and Francisco Monteiro Pereira de Queiroz.

The project was directed by Braga architect Manuel Fernandes da Silva until his death in 1753. After Fernandes da Silva's death, works continued under the direction of a team of building masters. Despite not fully finished, the temple was blessed on January 6, 1757. Madre de Deus Chapel was demolished in 1898 for street enlargement.

=== Modern period ===
In 1907–1908, celebrating the 150-year anniversary of the church, a new churchyard was built using black and white basaltic stones, with geometrical drawings. In 1935, the parish of the town split, and Matriz Church headed the inland parish area of the town, but kept being the largest in the municipality, with half of the population of the town.

Relief bronze doors were placed during the 250 years celebrations, with contributions from the parish population and Povoans abroad, especially Monsignor Abílio da Nova, priest of Copacabana in Rio de Janeiro, Brasil.

== Architecture ==
Designed by the notable 18th-century Portuguese architect Fernandes da Silva, the church is noted for its rich rococo altarpiece. The 18th-century façade has exuberant lines of Baroque art, with a trimmed gable where the Rocaille portal is cut, crowned by a royal blason, over which a niche is located. The niche has an icon of the Virgin Mary sculpted in rock.

The interior is wide and in a single nave covered by a barrel vault. The nave is strengthened by three robust toroidal arches and the walls are decorated by nine Joanino (King John's style) Baroque altars, in gilded woodcarving, displaying 18th century sculptures. Its retables are notable, especially the one from the chancel, exceptionally rich, in rococo style, made-up by six composite order capital columns. The Rocaille woodcarvings were created in the beginning of the style in Entre-Douro-E-Minho, between 1755–1758, and was the work of André Ribeiro Soares da Silva (1720-1769).

In the assets of the church, there's a green damson plum chasuble, with fine silk needlework, from the 16th century and an icon of Nossa Senhora da Boa Viagem from the 17th century. A sacristy furnishing has a wide set of siglas poveiras, written by the fishermen and in the altar's tabernacle door there's the coat-of-arms of Póvoa de Varzim.

The church's "Juana Coeli" (door of heaven) bronze doors, with religious relief, is the work of sculptor Rui Anahory, who gained notability after his work on Touro sculpture (1995).

Matriz Church of Póvoa de Varzim was classified by IGESPAR, the Portuguese monuments institute, as a building with public importance in 1977.

Matriz Church

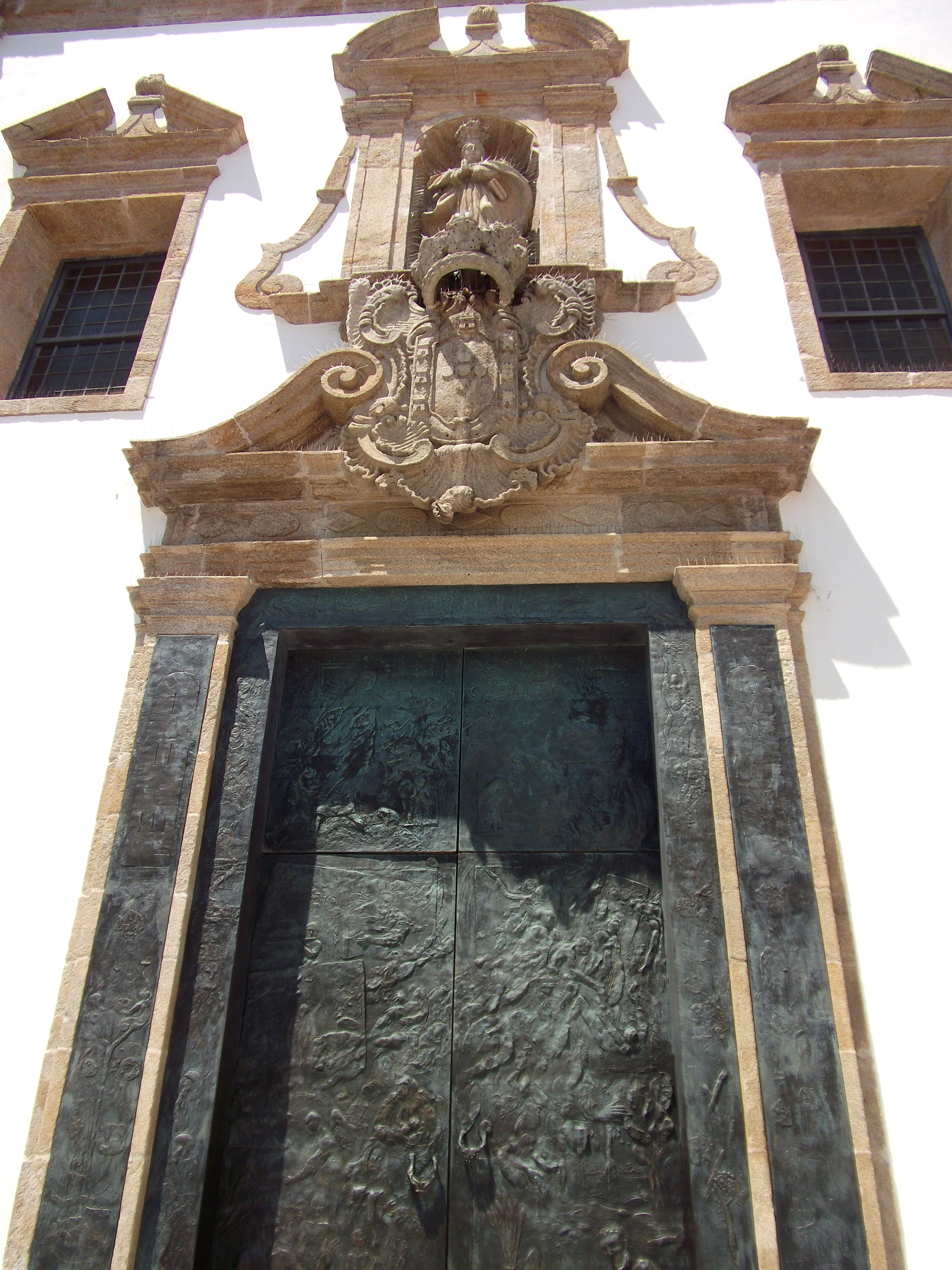
Rococo Portal with contemporary bronze doors

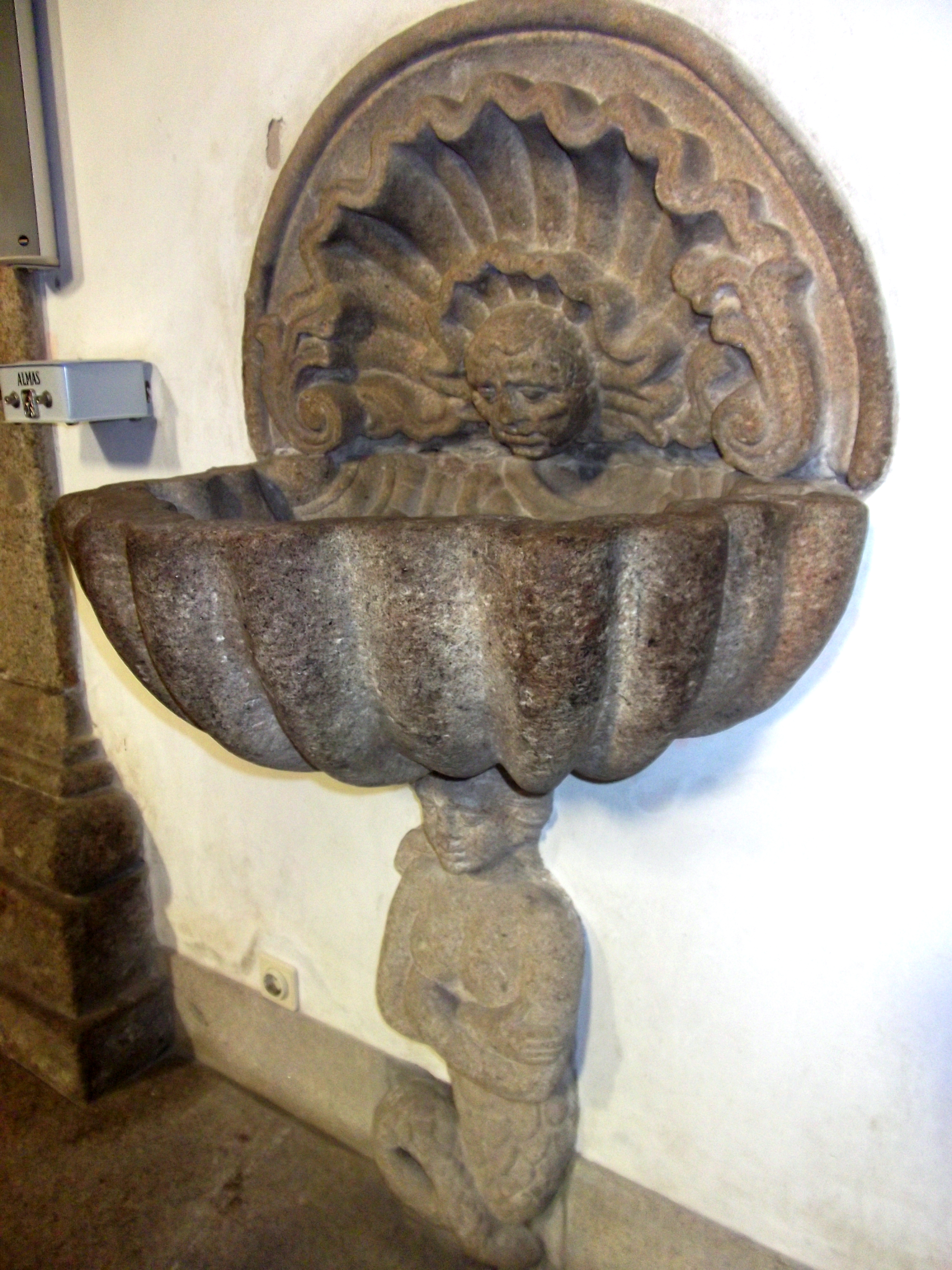
Maritime-themed sculpture

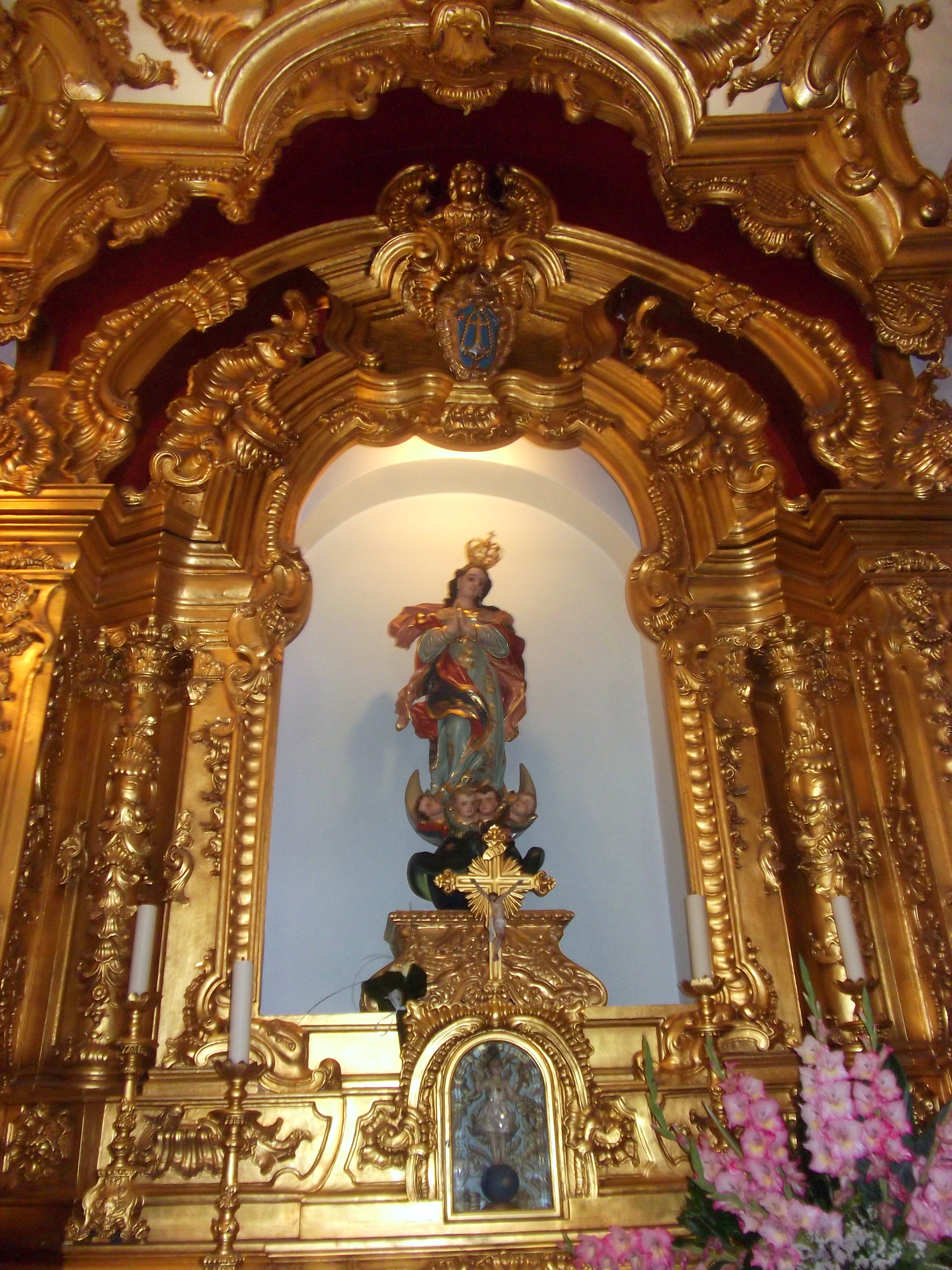
Joanino Baroque Side Altar dedicated to Our Lady of Conception with the Coat-of-Arms of Póvoa de Varzim
