= Fonte Boa e Rio Tinto =

- Civil parish
- Location in Portugal
- Coordinates: 41.499°N 8.739°W
- Country: Portugal
- Region: Norte
- Intermunic. comm.: Cávado
- District: Braga
- Municipality: Esposende

Area
  - Total: 10.38 km^{2} (4.01 sq mi)

Population (2011)
  - Total: 1,944
  - Density: 187.3/km^{2} (485.1/sq mi)
- Time zone: UTC+00:00 (WET)
  - Summer (DST): UTC+01:00 (WEST)

Fonte Boa e Rio Tinto is a civil parish in the municipality of Esposende, Portugal. It was formed in 2013 by the merger of the former parishes Fonte Boa and Rio Tinto. The population in 2011 was 1,944, in an area of 10.38 km^{2}.
