= Esposende, Marinhas e Gandra =

- Civil parish
- Location in Portugal
- Coordinates: 41.531°N 8.781°W
- Country: Portugal
- Region: Norte
- Intermunic. comm.: Cávado
- District: Braga
- Municipality: Esposende

Area
  - Total: 17.31 km^{2} (6.68 sq mi)

Population (2011)
  - Total: 11,111
  - Density: 641.9/km^{2} (1,662/sq mi)
- Time zone: UTC+00:00 (WET)
  - Summer (DST): UTC+01:00 (WEST)

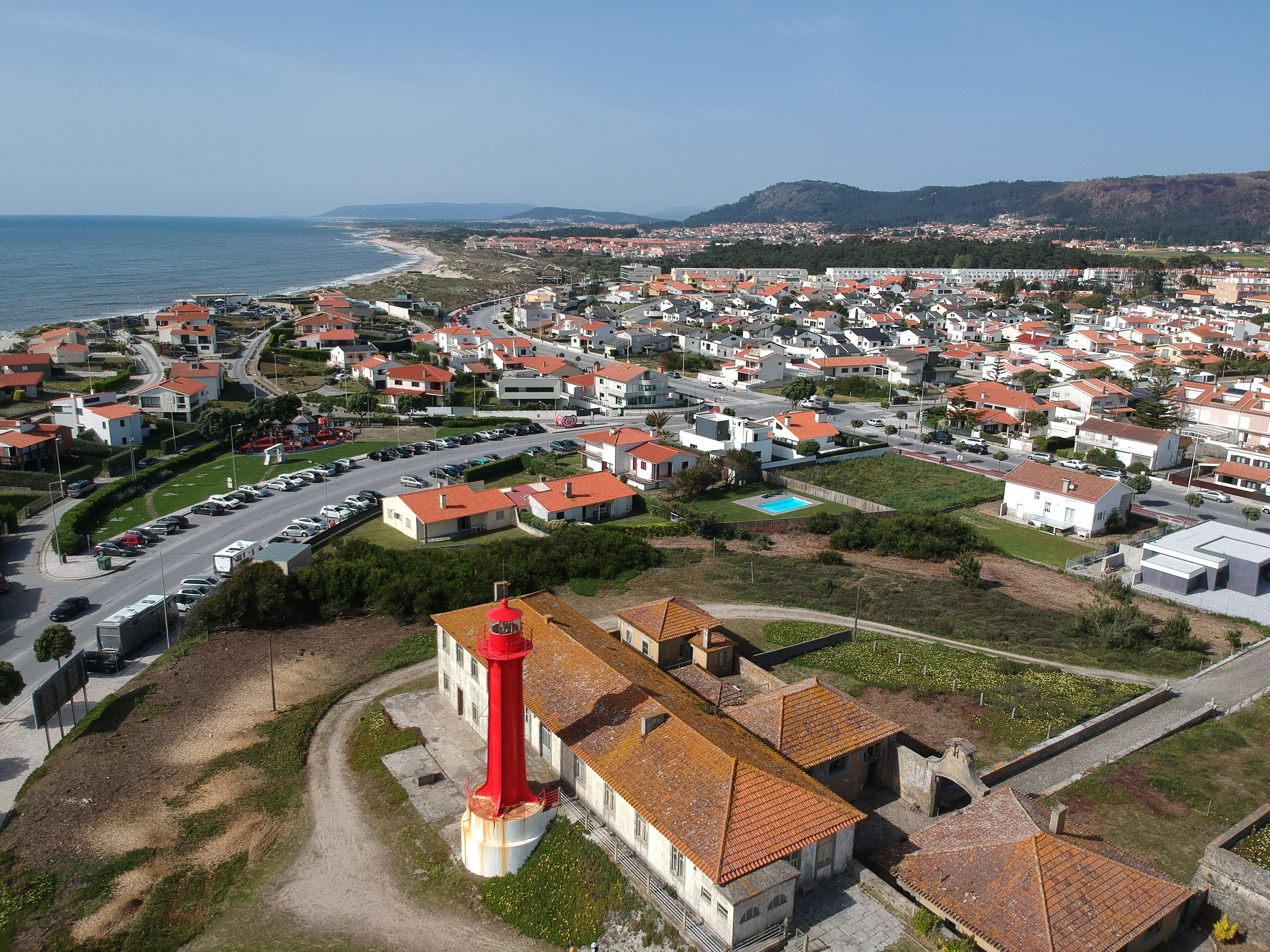
Aerial photograph of Esposende 2019

Esposende, Marinhas e Gandra is a civil parish in the municipality of Esposende, Portugal. It was formed in 2013 by the merger of the former parishes Esposende, Marinhas and Gandra. The population in 2011 was 11,111, in an area of 17.31 km^{2} (6.68 sq mi).
