= Esposende =

- Municipality
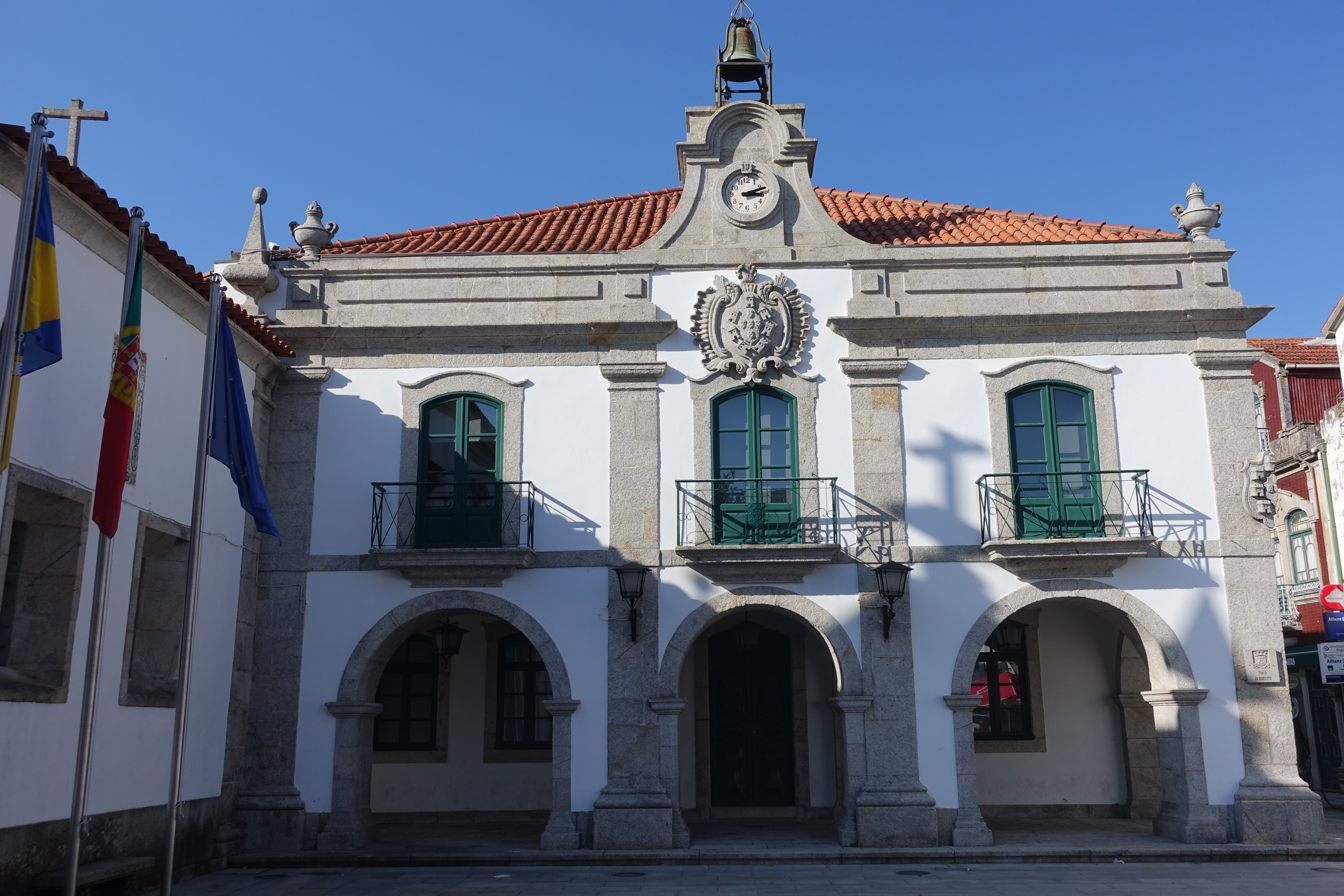
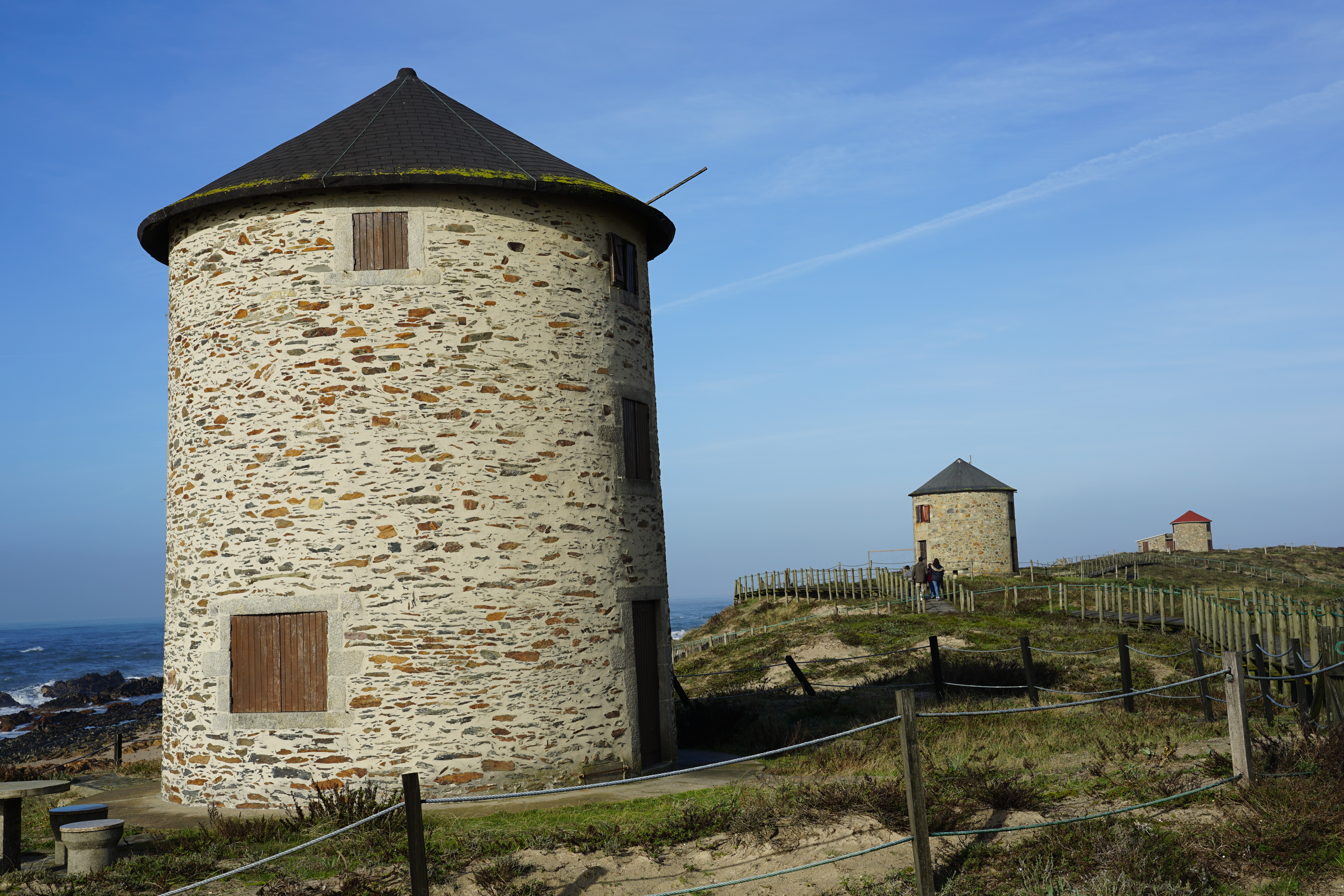
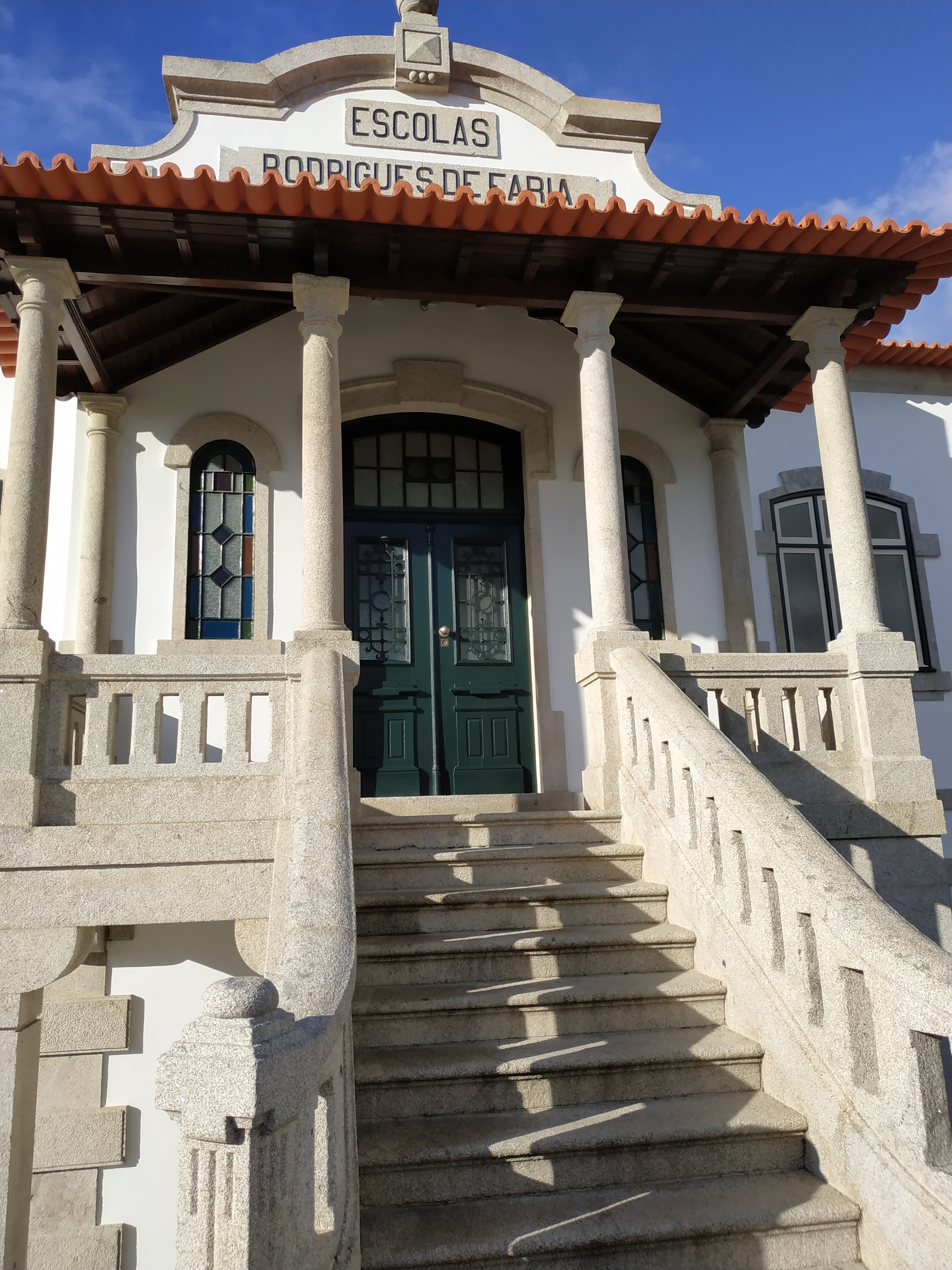
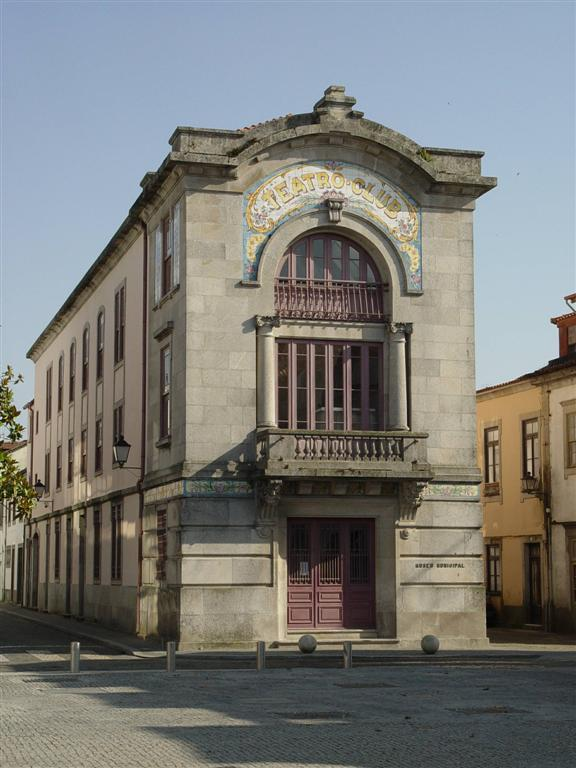
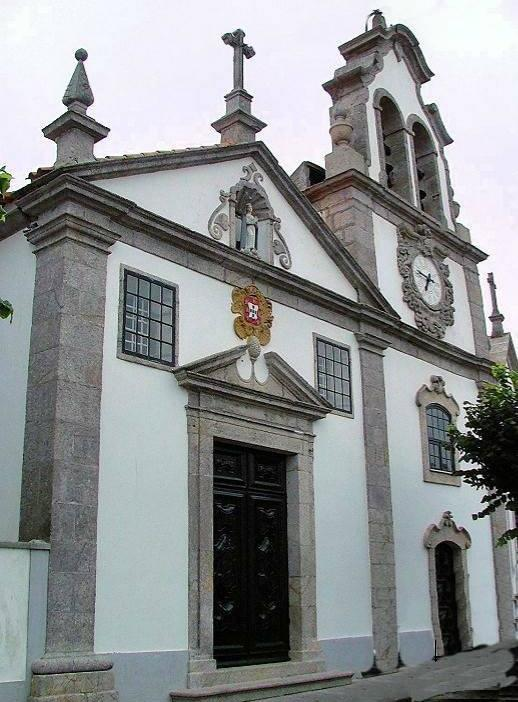
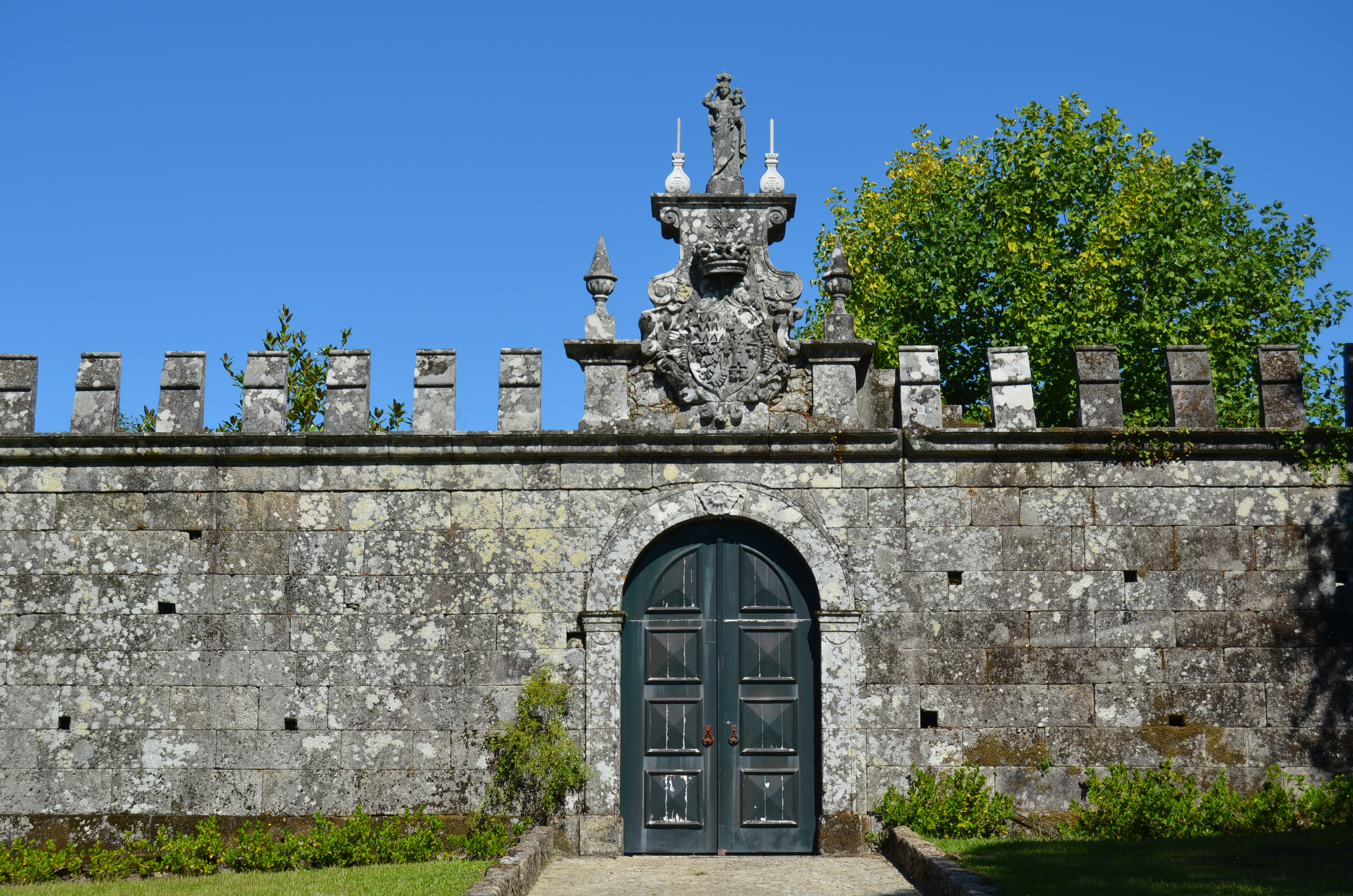
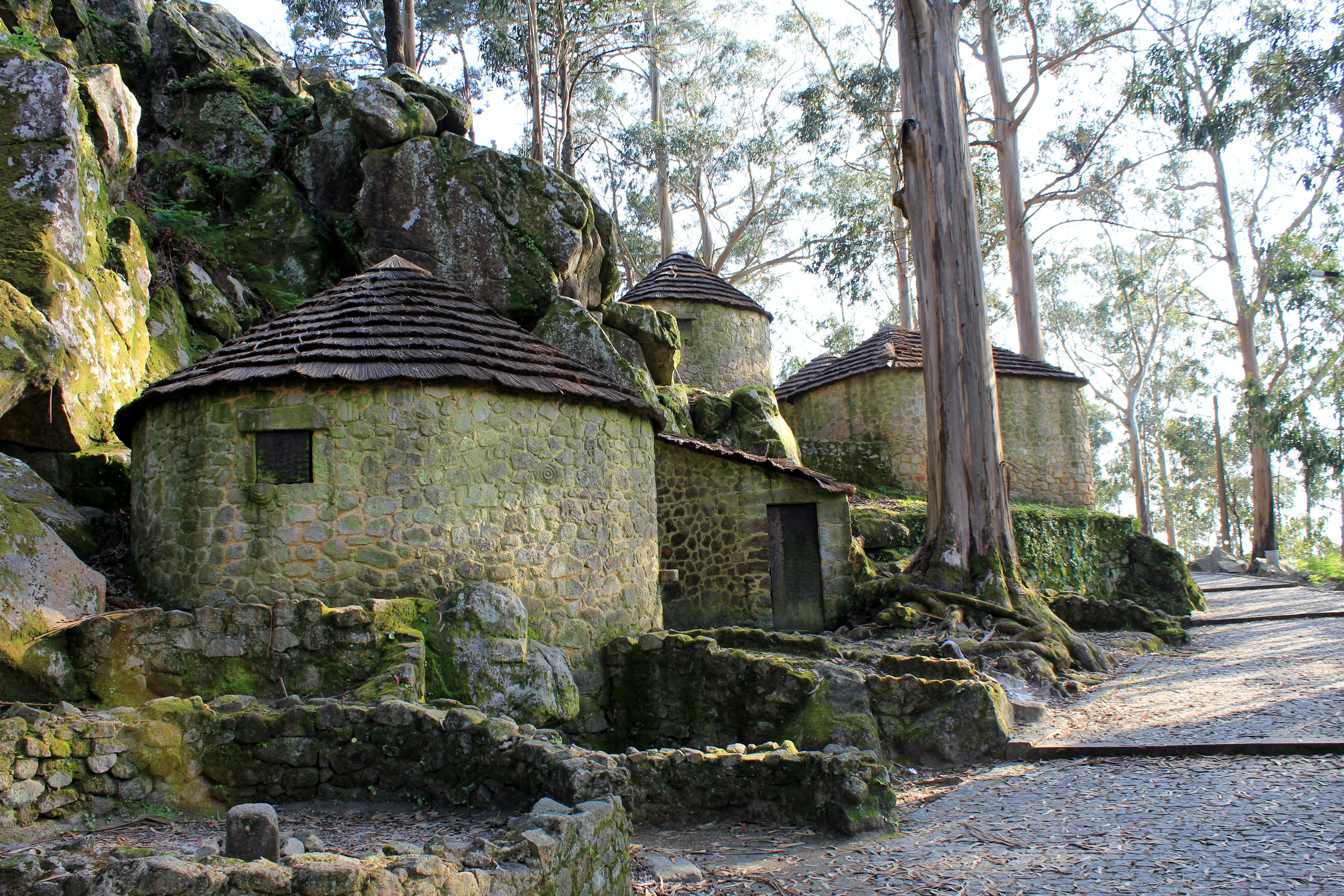

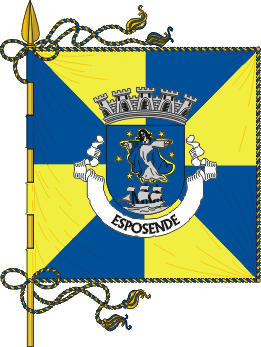
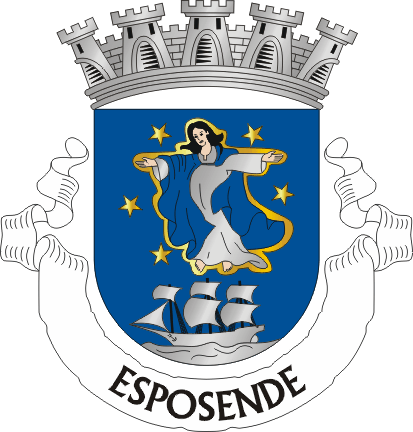
- Flag Coat of arms
- Interactive map of Esposende
- Location in Portugal
- Coordinates: 41°32′N 8°47′W
- Country: Portugal
- Region: Norte
- Intermunic. comm.: Cávado
- District: Braga
- Parishes: 9

Government
  - President: Guilherme Emílio (PSD)

Area
  - Total: 95.41 km^{2} (36.84 sq mi)

Population (2011)
  - Total: 34,254
  - Density: 359.0/km^{2} (929.9/sq mi)
- Time zone: UTC+00:00 (WET)
  - Summer (DST): UTC+01:00 (WEST)
- Website: http://www.cm-esposende.pt/

Esposende (Portuguese pronunciation: [ɨʃpɔˈzẽdɨ]) is a city and a municipality in Braga District in Portugal. The population in 2011 was 34,254, in an area of 95.41 km^{2}. The city itself (the parish Esposende, Marinhas e Gandra) had a population of 9,197 in 2001. It gained city status on 2 July 1993. The present Mayor is Fernando Couto Cepa, elected by the Social Democratic Party. The municipal holiday is August 19. It is located on the Portuguese Way of the Camino de Santiago.

== Demographics ==
Population of Esposende Municipality (1801–2008)
1801	1849	1900	1930	1960	1981	1991	2001	2011
4 157	12 545	15 161	19 452	23 966	28 652	30 101	33 325	34 254

== Economy ==
Fishing, agriculture and tourism are important for the economy of the municipality. Prozis, a multinational sports nutrition company, is headquartered in Esposende.

== Parishes ==
Administratively, the municipality is divided into nine civil parishes (freguesias):

- Antas
- Apúlia e Fão
- Belinho e Mar
- Esposende, Marinhas e Gandra
- Fonte Boa e Rio Tinto
- Forjães
- Gemeses
- Palmeira de Faro e Curvos
- Vila Chã

== Photos ==
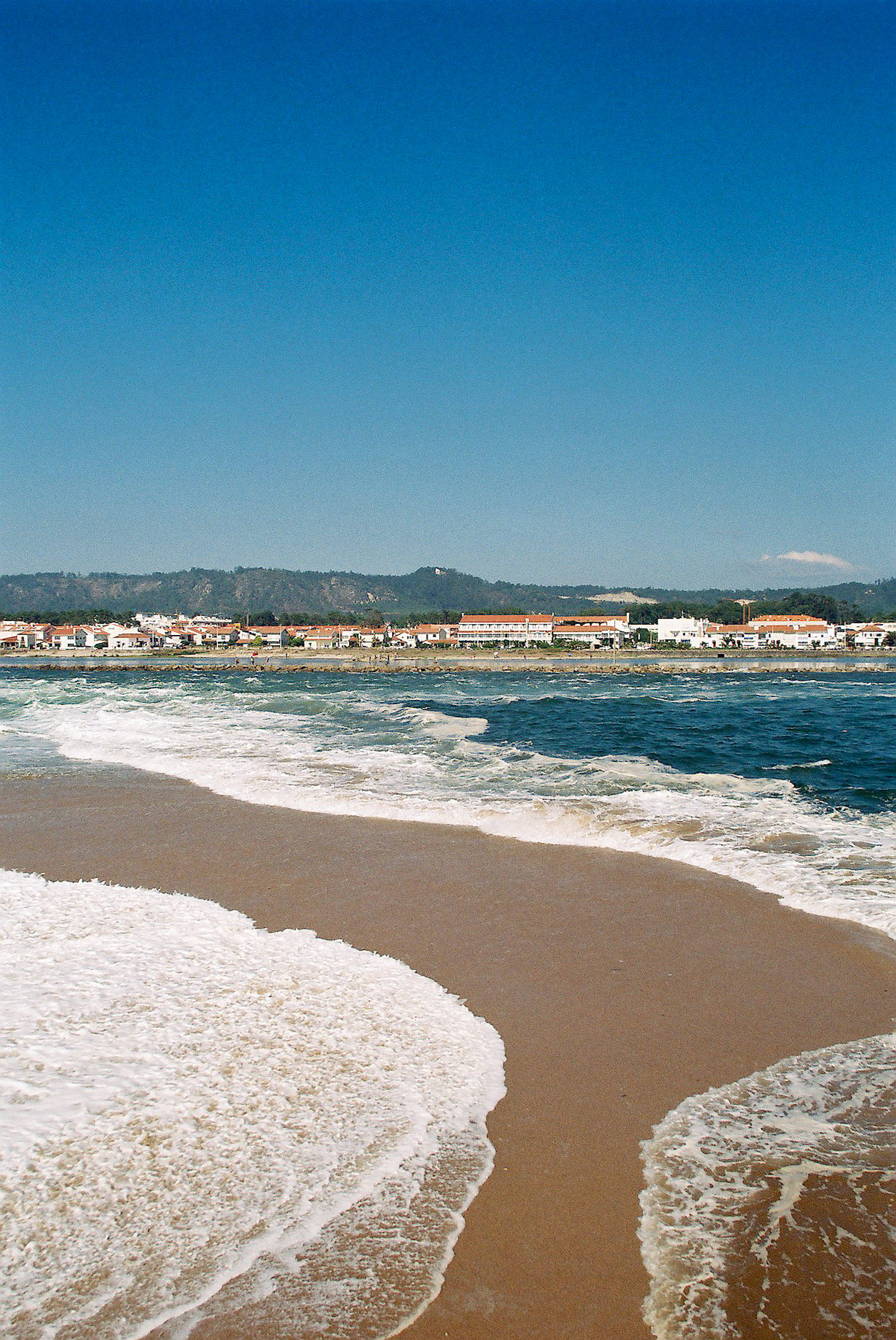
Cávado River in Esposende

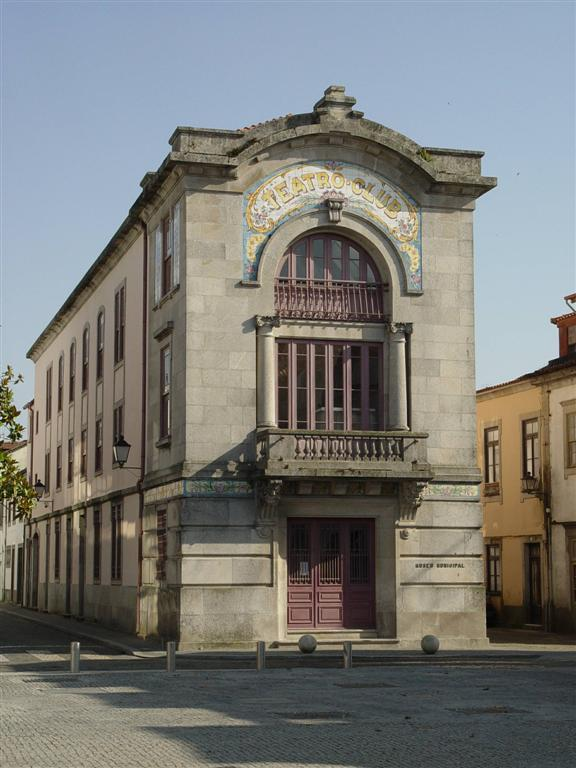
Esposende Museum

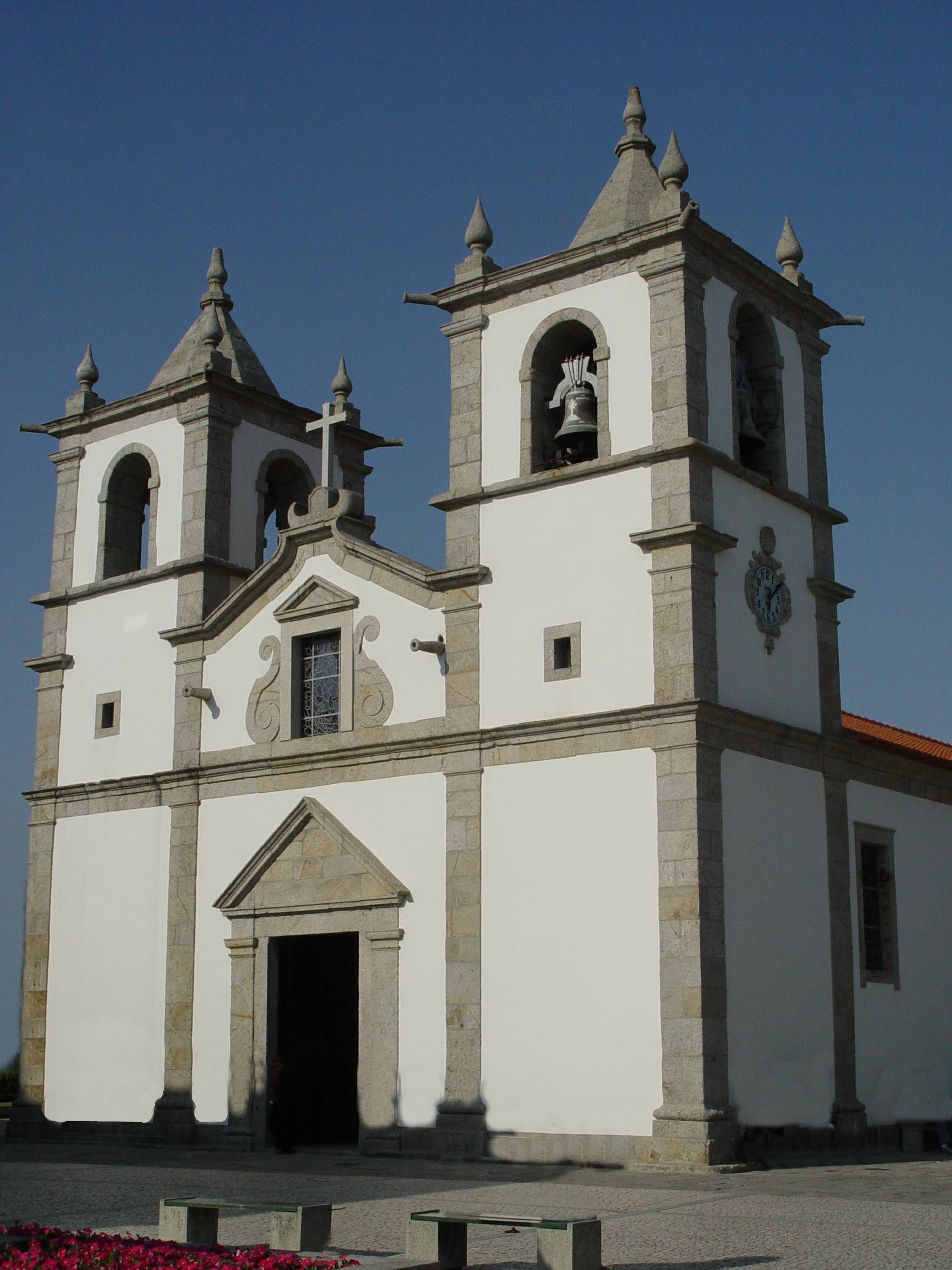
Matriz Church

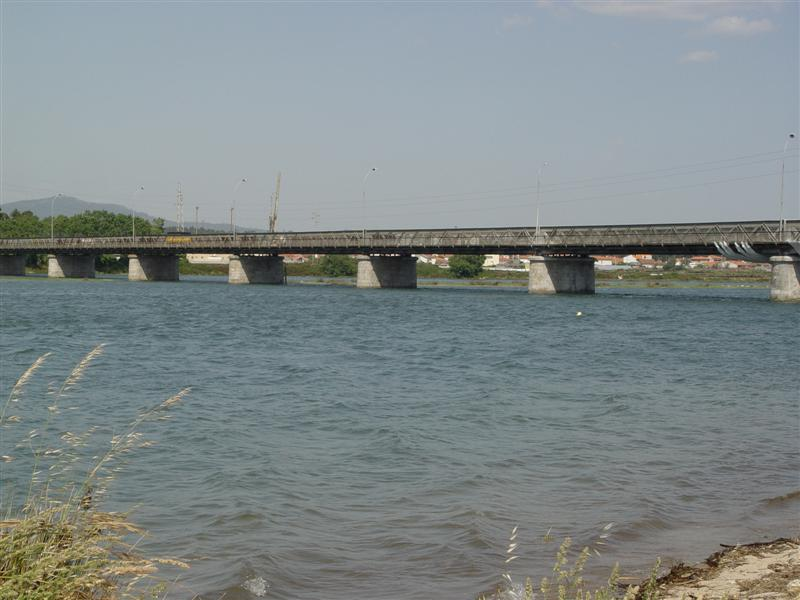
Fão Bridge

== Notable people ==
- António Rodrigues Sampaio (1806—1882) a politician and President of the Council of Ministers in 1881
- Paulo Gonçalves (1979–2020) a rally racing motorcycle rider.
- Teresa Portela (born 1987) a sprint canoer
- Arsénio Nunes (born 1989) a footballer with over 300 club caps
- Rafael Lopes (born 1991) a footballer with over 400 club caps
