= Agro-Velho =

Coordinates: 41°23′36″N 8°46′26″W

Nova Póvoa
- District of Póvoa de Varzim
- Agro-Velho
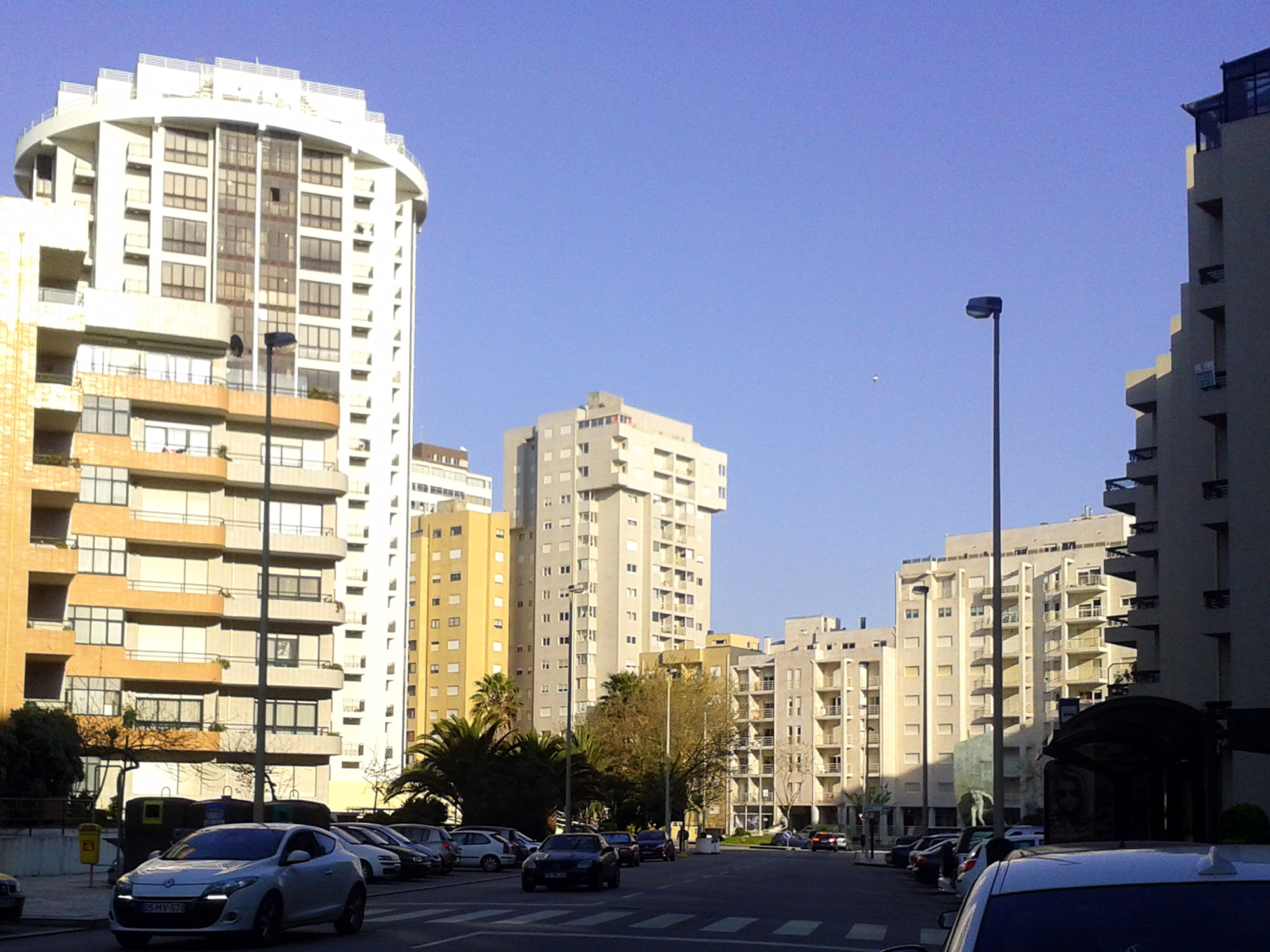
- Avenida Repatriamento dos Poveiros

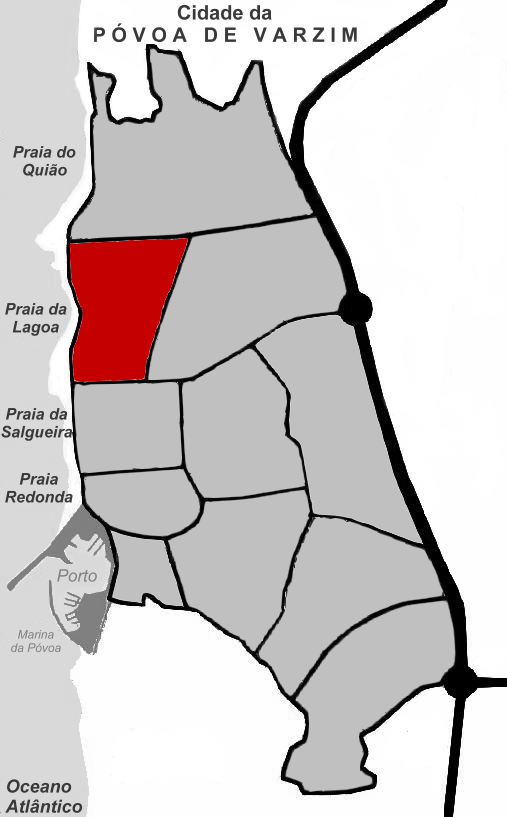
- District's location in the city's urban area

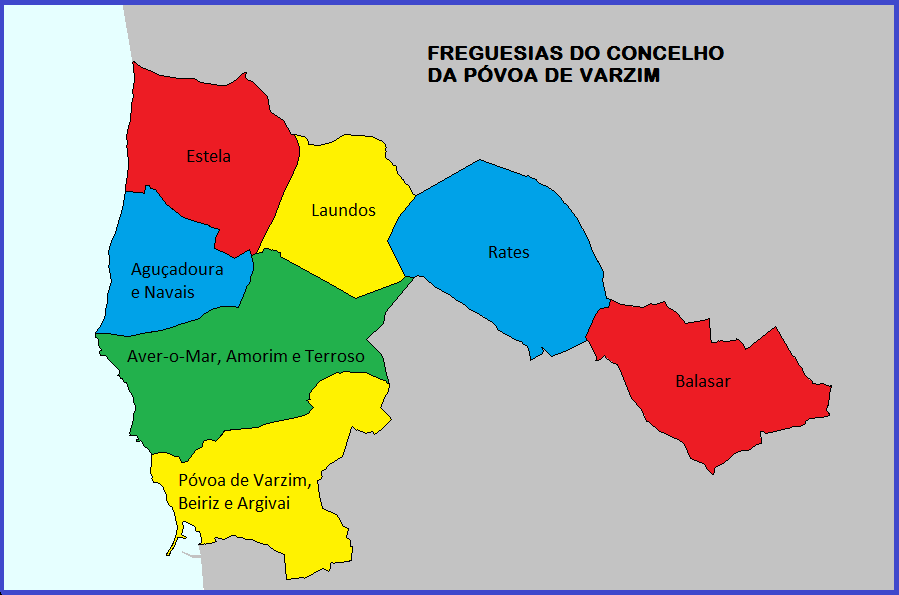
- Póvoa de Varzim
- Country: Portugal
- District: Porto
- Municipality: Póvoa de Varzim
- Postal Code: 4490
- Area code: 252

Agro-Velho, historically and popularly known as Nova Póvoa, is one of the eleven officially designated districts located in the Portuguese city of Póvoa de Varzim. It is a beach resort district located around Lagoa Cove.

It was mostly developed between the 1970s and the 1980s with high-rise buildings in the area of a dried-up saltwater lagoon, and it is the north expansion of the city's traditional beach district, Bairro Norte. Most of the highrise buildings of the city are clustered in this area, around Vasco da Gama avenue.

The beachfront area was the location of a Roman fish factory complex, one of the buildings dated to the 1st century, the district only developed in the 20th century with the northwards expansion of Avenida dos Banhos and opening of Avenida Vasco da Gama. Early attractions include the horse track Velódromo in 1925, which later became Gomes de Amorim stadium, home of Sporting Club da Póvoa (1916-1940s), Varzim S.C. stadium in 1932, and the Póvoa de Varzim Bullfighting Arena in 1949. It became the sports center of Póvoa de Varzim for much of the 20th century.

== Urban morphology ==
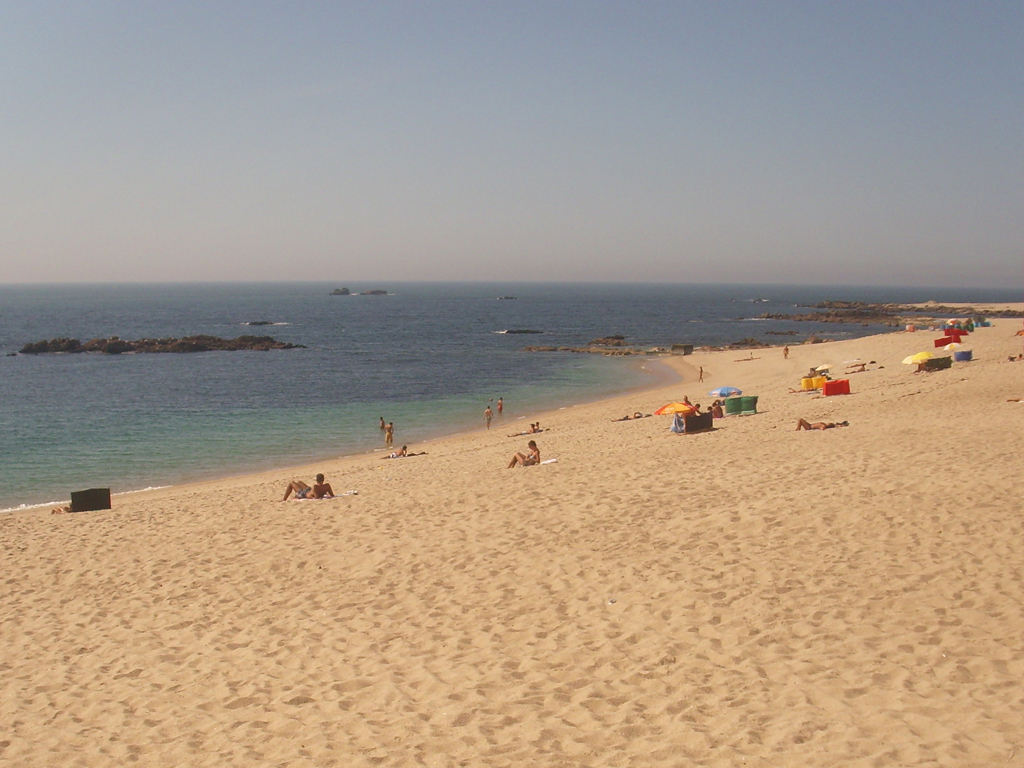
Lagoa Beach during low tide in mid-September.

Agro-Velho is bounded by Bairro Norte on the south, Parque da Cidade on the east, A Ver-o-Mar to the north, and by the Atlantic Ocean to the west.

It is located on the site of a former lagoon. The name of the district's beach, "Lagoa" (Lagoon in English) is taken from it. The district is the northwards expansion of Póvoa's traditional beach district, the Bairro Norte.

=== Beaches ===
The district's main beach is Lagoa, in Lagoa Cove, there are others in the cove's flanks, such as Beijinhos and Verde Beach to the south and Fragosinho to the North. Lagoa has a surfing spot and the beachfront is, currently, mostly pedestrian and has beach bars.

=== Main streets and squares ===
Avenida Vasco da Gama, the south boundary with Bairro Norte, is one of the main central business avenues of the city. The wide Praça Almeida Garrett is the main district's square, but unofficial Touro Square, with its famous sculpture, between Vasco da Gama and Repatriamento dos Poveiros is the most charismatic and famous of the district's squares.

In the waterfront, the district is bounded by Rua do Varzim Sport Club street, the street is now mostly pedestrian, and Rua Gomes de Amorim (EN13 Highway) on the east, Avenida Repatriamento dos Poveiros and its expansion (Rua 27 de Fevereiro) cross the district.

=== Venues ===
Relevant sports venues of the city are located in the beachfront: the Varzim S.C. Stadium, Póvoa de Varzim Bullfighting area for bullfighting, horse shows and music concerts, Varzim Lazer swimming and tennis complex, and Clube Desportivo da Póvoa swimming and pavilion complex.

=== City towers ===
Póvoa de Varzim was one of the urban centres that adopted the tower concept, resulting in an urban chaos described as one of the worst urban landscapes in the country. One of the earliest towers is the Edifício Norton de Matos (circa 54 m, 16 floors), built in 1974 between Rua Gomes de Amorim and Avenida Vasco da Gama. Most of the other towers followed loos. The latest is Forte de São Pedro, with the same height and number of floors. It was built in 2002, when the city council had already decided to stop the construction of high-rises. Agro-Velho also has the tallest building in Póvoa de Varzim, the Edifício Nova Póvoa (ca. 90 m, 30 floors) built between 1974 - 1982. The tower has over 1,000 residents during the summer. Although it is not currently the tallest building, it is still the residential building with the most floors in Portugal.

Axis Vermar Hotel (ca. 58 m, 15 floors) was designed by architect Rui Cesariny Calafate, and originally it is the Vermar Hotel (1974) created by Sopete, which previously owned Casino da Póvoa.

Tallest buildings in Póvoa de Varzim
Tower	Floors	Commemoration
1. Nova Póvoa	30	Expansion of Póvoa de Varzim
2. Eça de Queiroz	20	Eça de Queiroz, local writer
3. Torre n.º70	19	-
4. Gomes do Monte	18	Local entrepreneur
5. Coimbra 2	17	City of Coimbra
6. Silva Porto	17	Silva Porto, Portuguese painter
7. Cristal Mar	17	The sea
8. Norton de Matos	16	Norton de Matos, Governor-general of Angola
9. Forte de São Pedro	16	Saint Peter, Póvoa de Varzim Holiday
10. Lagoa Azul	16	The Lagoon
11. Axis Vermar Hotel	15	The sea
12. Vasco da Gama	15	Vasco da Gama, Portuguese explorer
13. Alto Mar	14	The high seas
14. EuroPóvoa	14	Europe
15. Sopete	14	Local company
16. Coimbra 1	13	City of Coimbra
17. Brisamar	13	Sea breeze
18. Casa dos Poveiros	13	Casa dos Poveiros
19. Campos Cunha	13	Local politician
20. Emanuel-Mar	12	The sea

Nova Póvoa streetscape

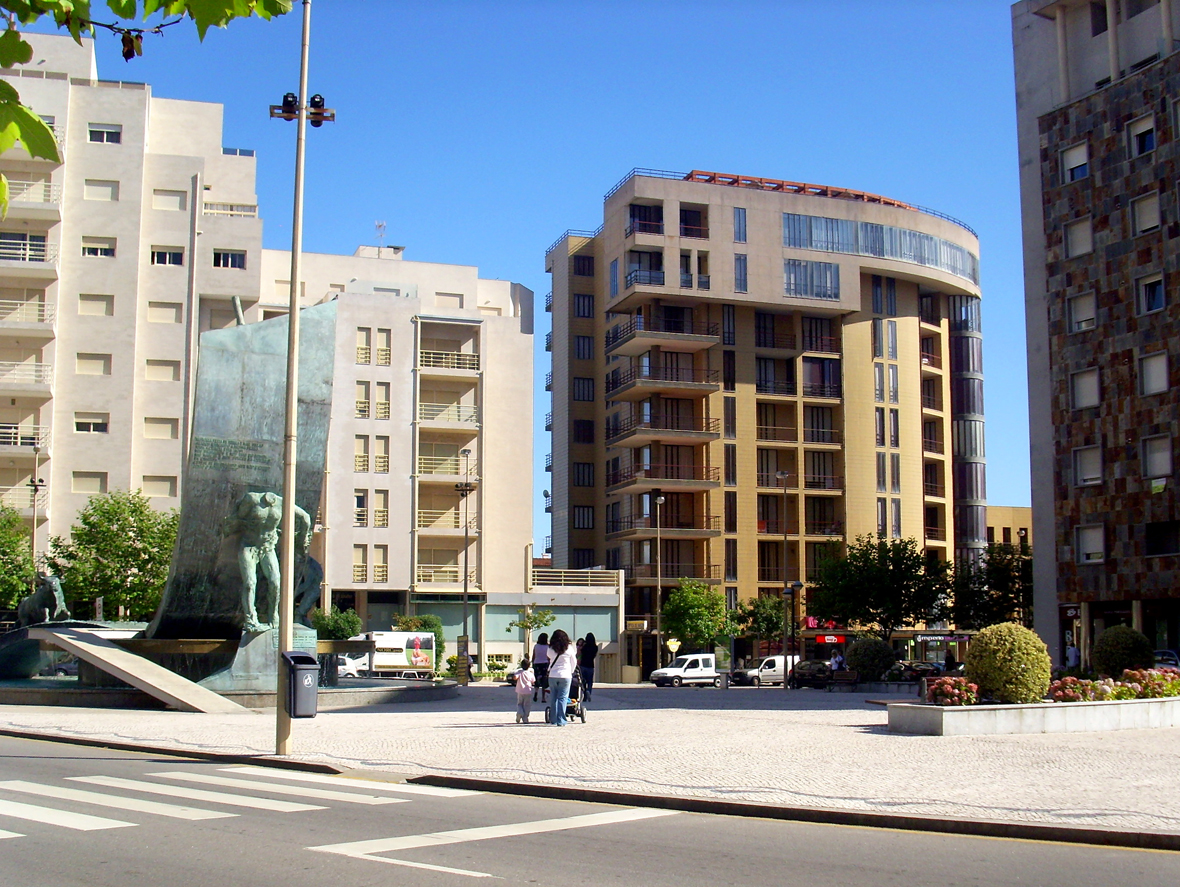
Touro intersection.

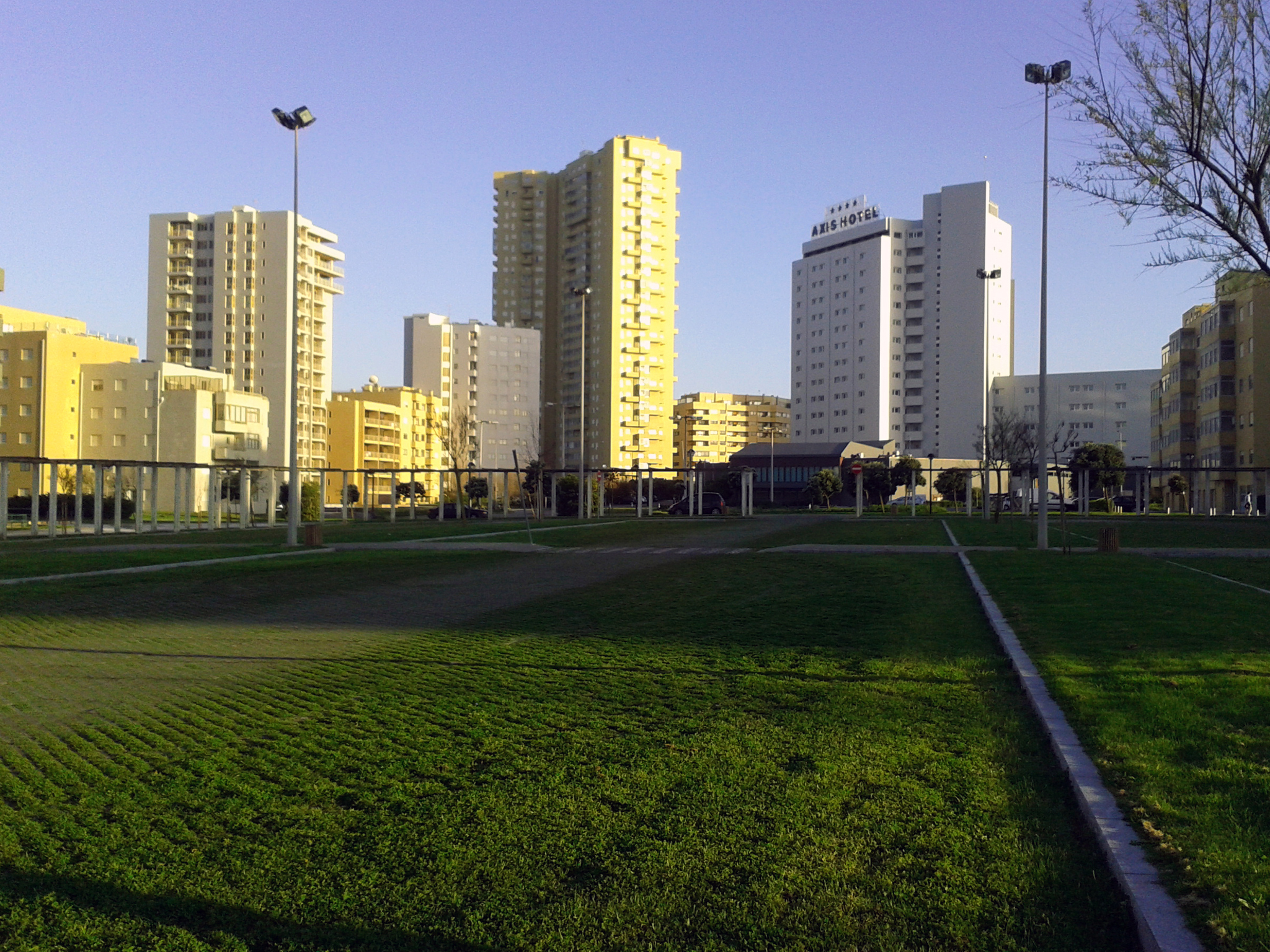
Praça Almeida Garrett and Lagoa Azul, Nova Póvoa and Vermar tower.

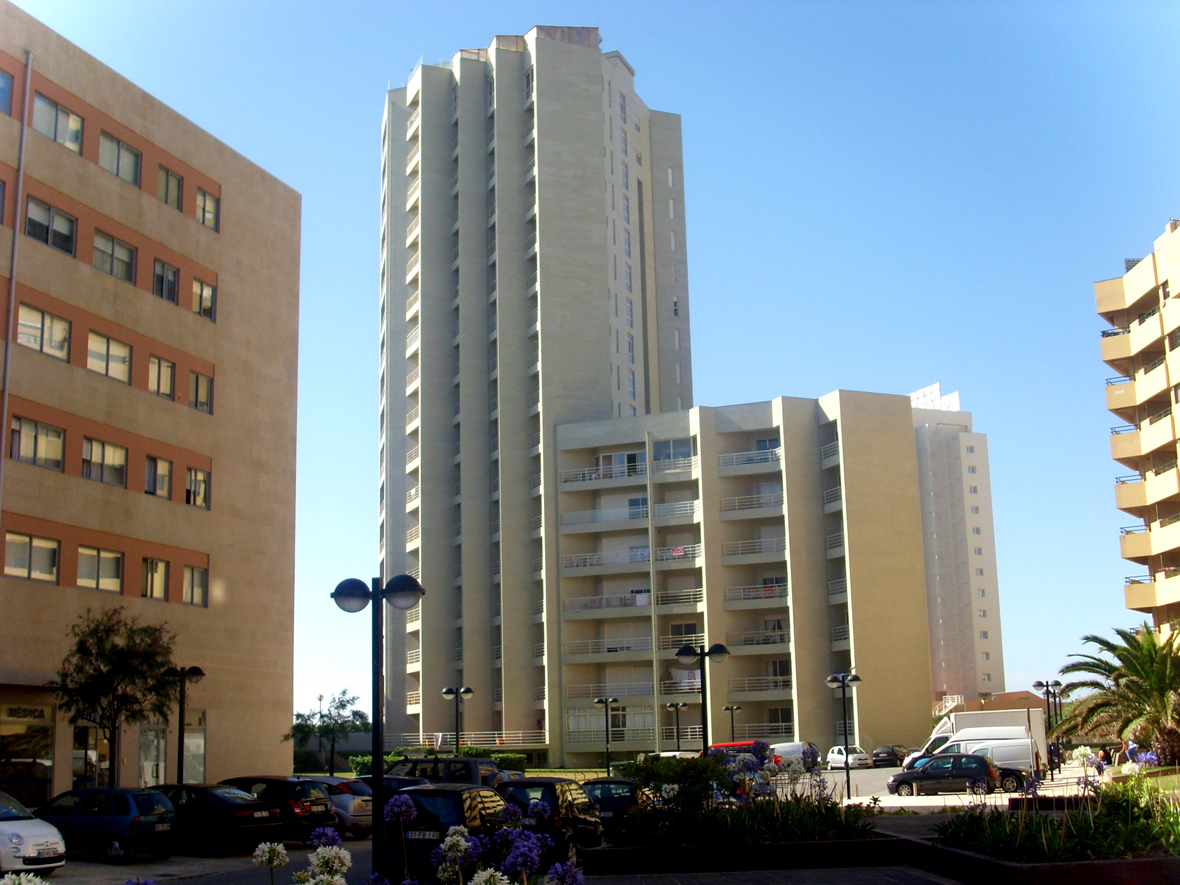
Rua Alfredo Graça and the 70 tower.
