= Sculptures in Póvoa de Varzim =

List of the main sculptures found in Póvoa de Varzim, Portugal.

Póvoa de Varzim Sculpture	Commemoration	Date	Notes	Location in Póvoa de Varzim	Image
Pelourinho da Póvoa de Varzim	Autonomy of Póvoa de Varzim. Póvoa de Varzim in the Portuguese Discoveries.	1514	Granted by King Manuel I of Portugal. Listed as a National Monument.	Praça do Almada (civic center)	
Cruzeiro do Cemitério	Cemetery calvary.	19th century?		Rua Almeida Brandão	
Cruzeiro Verde	Parochial calvary.	19th century?		Praça do Almada (Largo Eça de Queiroz)	
Cruzeiro de Aver-o-Mar	Parochial calvary.	1904		Rua Barão da Areia; Rua Augusto Santos	
Cego do Maio	Honors Cego do Maio, a fishermen. Local Hero	1909	Financed by Povoans of Brazil and Garrett Theater	Passeio Alegre square (waterfront)	
Monumento aos Mortos da Grande Guerra	Povoans who died in World War I.	1933		Praça Marquês de Pombal (market square)	
Cruzeiro da Independência	800 years of the independence of Portugal	1940	By the National Body of Scouts	Praça Marquês de Pombal (market square)	
Eça de Queiroz	Honors Eça de Queiroz, one of the most influential writer in the Portuguese language, born in Póvoa de Varzim	1952	By Povoans of Brazil	Praça do Almada (civic center)	
Vasques Calafate	Honors Vasques Calafate, lobbied for the works in the Port of Póvoa de Varzim	1965	By Povoan fishermen	Avenida dos Descobrimentos (waterfront)	
Marco do Milénio	Millennium Mark which commemorates 1000 years — from March 26, 953 — of the first known record confirming the existence of Póvoa de Varzim.	1973	By the City Hall	Largo das Dores (old town)	
Francisco Sá Carneiro	Former prime minister	1981	By a group of citizens	Praça Luís de Camões	
Às Gentes da Póvoa de Varzim	Honors the unity of the municipality and the difference between the fisherman of the coast and the inland farmer.	1995	By the Rotary Club of Póvoa de Varzim	Touro, Avenida Vasco da Gama	
São Pedro	Patron saint. Saint Peter Festival of 1996.	1996	By the City Hall	Avenida dos Descobrimentos (waterfront)	
Peixeira / Mulher poveira	To the Fisherwoman / Povoan Woman. Saint Peter Festival of 1997.	1997	By the City Hall	Avenida dos Descobrimentos (waterfront)	
David Alves	Mayor of Póvoa de Varzim responsible for the new Market square and other developments	1999	By the City Hall	Praça Marquês de Pombal (market square)	
Major Mota	Mayor of Póvoa de Varzim responsible for the street's pedestrianization and other developments	2003	By the City Hall	Rua da Junqueira (shopping street)	
Fernando Pessoa	120 years of the birth of Fernando Pessoa.	2008	By Casino da Póvoa	Passeio Alegre (waterfront)	
Rocha Peixoto	100 years of the death of Rocha Peixoto.	2010	By the City Hall	Rua Padre Afonso Soares (Rocha Peixoto Library garden)	
