= Avenida dos Banhos =

Street in Póvoa de Varzim, Portugal

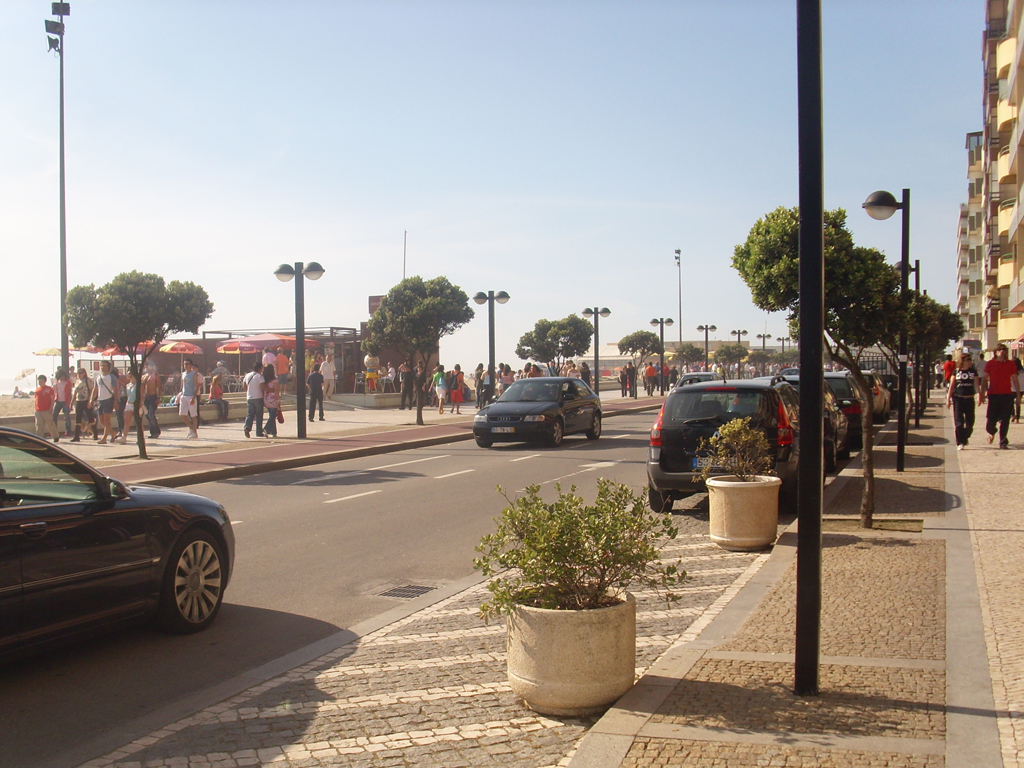
Avenida dos Banhos in a sunny spring day.

Avenida dos Banhos (Portuguese: Baths Avenue), is the main waterfront street and a popular tourist attraction in Póvoa de Varzim, Portugal. It roughly encompasses the central waterfront area of Póvoa de Varzim from Passeio Alegre Square and the Port of Póvoa de Varzim to Vasco da Gama Avenue.

== History ==
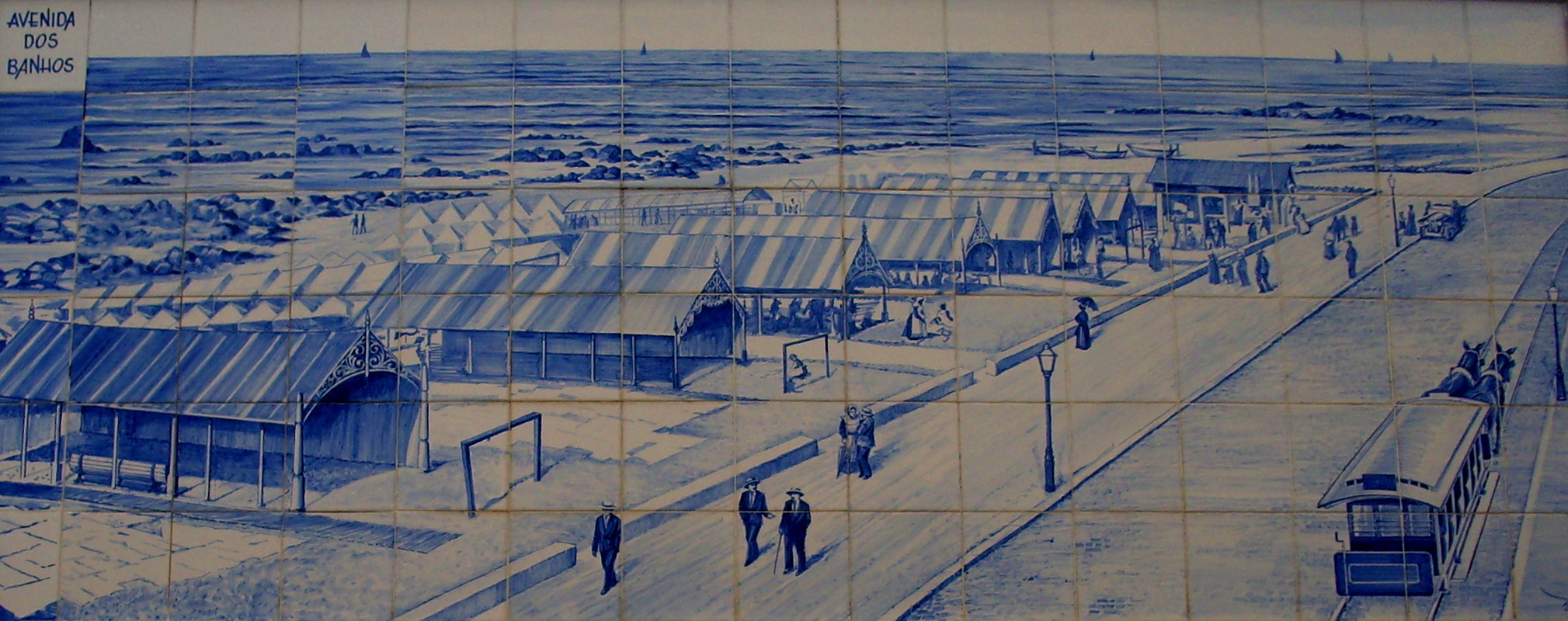
Avenida dos Banhos was one of the principal destinations for streetcars.

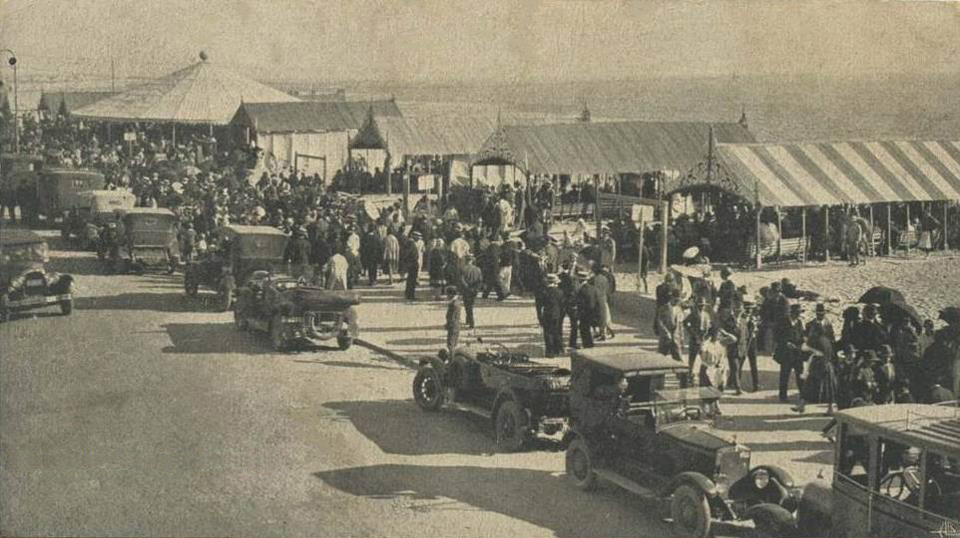
Avenida dos Banhos in 1921. Café Guarda-Sol's umbrella is visible in the background.

Beach-going in Póvoa de Varzim was concentrated around Passeio Alegre. In 1812, the Avenue was known as Rua da Regoiça street and was populated by fishermen houses of Bairro Norte. With the popularity of this district's beaches, summer houses started appearing and was, spontaneously called, Banhos street around 1846. In 1897 it gained the current naming as Avenida dos Banhos, it was known as Avenida Brasil since 1916 and in 1926, Rua dos Heróis da Grande Guerra. Only in 1966 the Avenida dos Banhos popular naming was officially adopted.

David José Alves planned the creation of a great Avenida dos Banhos to rival Nice and Ostend, and in 1917 he commissioned a project to architect Moura Coutinho. The project aimed for an avenue tipped with multifamily villas, with a modernist style and arcades and some uniformity in the façades, but the project failed.

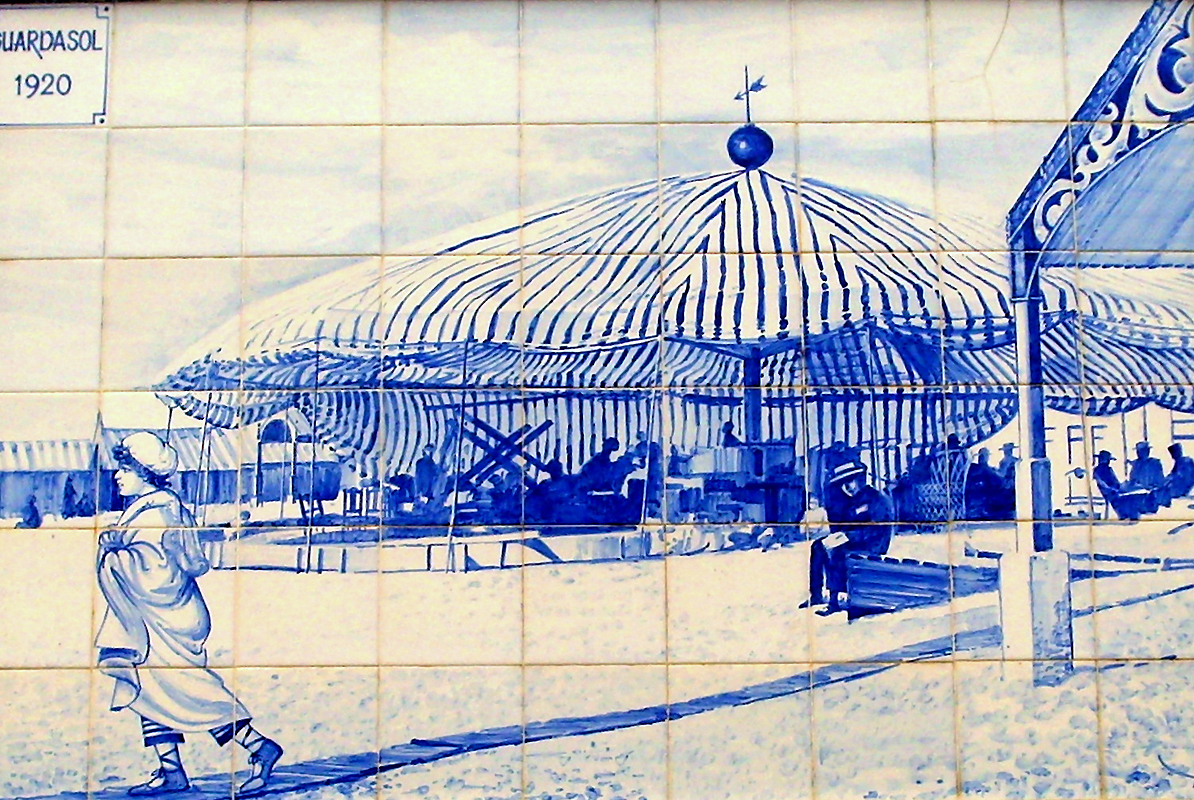
Portuguese azulejo depicting Guarda-Sol beach bar in 1920.

The current buildings of Café Guarda-Sol and Diana-Bar are from 1838-1939, during the administration of mayor Silveira Campos. The project was very controversial even when it was built. Café Guardasol development replaced a 1920s notable and popular wooden beach bar covered with a massive summer umbrella. Diana Bar, with a 1930s modern architecture and unusual in Portugal, became a very notable beach bar, especially popular among writers and used for tertulia sessions.

Since the 1960s and especially in the 1970s and a rapidly increasing population with returning Portuguese-Africans from Angola and Mozambique, the single family villas which existed in the avenue were replaced by multifamily buildings with little attention to the aesthetics. Since 1998, the recovery of the avenue was a project led by architect Rui Bianchi, of Póvoa de Varzim City Hall, which gained an honorable mention in the second edition of the tourism prize in beach category of the Portuguese Institute of Tourism.

Initially, the avenue was popular only during the hot summer days, but the opening of the A7 and A11 motorways in early 2000s, made it a year around popular destination in Northern Portugal for weekends and sunny days. Occasionally, during the summer and due to the high number of visitor, the avenue is closed to traffic.

== Urban morphology ==
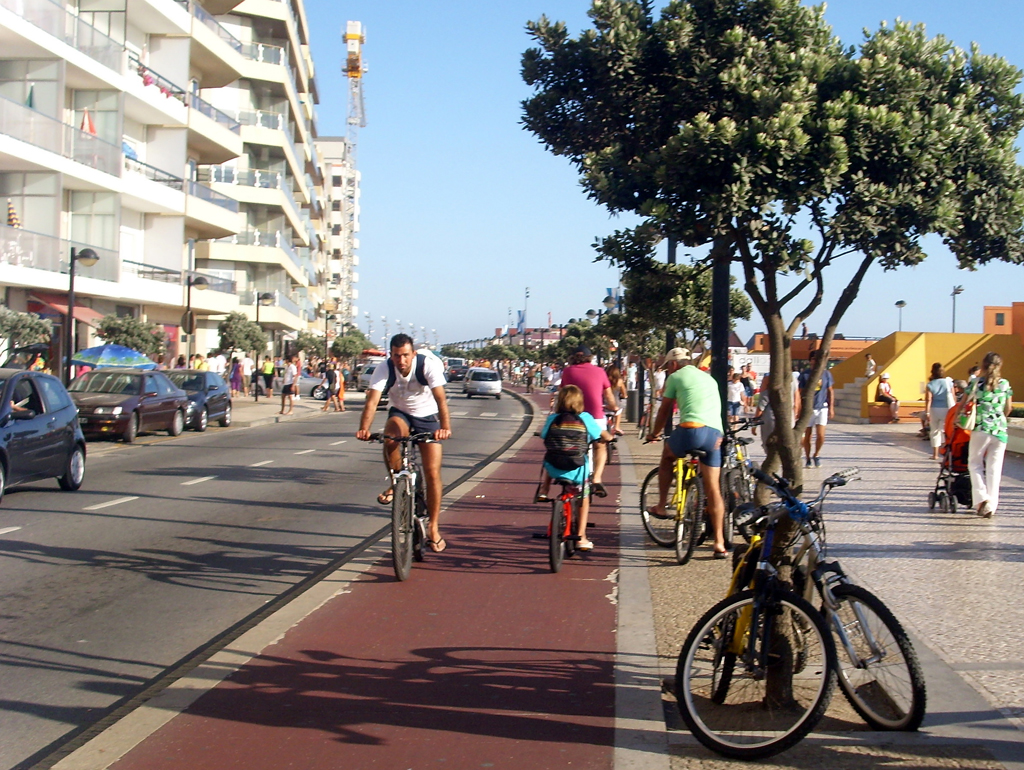
Avenida dos Banhos bikeway. The bikeway route linked Avenida dos Banhos and the Port of Póvoa de Varzim. Later development in Vila do Conde expanded it to the Ave river.

One of the most popular tourist attractions in Northern Portugal, Avenida dos Banhos is a 960 metres (3,150 ft) long avenue. Its sidewalk, formally known as Picadeiro, is best known for being the location of central beaches: Redonda (in the 19th century known as Banhos Beach), Salgueira and Verde. It is the location of a beachfront bikeway, several wooden-built beach bars and the oldest beach bar in Portugal — Café Guardassol, popular nightclubs, Diana-Bar Beach Library, Carvalhido esplanade, Passeio Alegre and Casino da Póvoa. It also links the two major avenues of Póvoa de Varzim, Avenida Mouzinho de Albuquerque and Avenida Vasco da Gama.
