= José Falcón =

Portuguese matador

José Carlos Frita Falcão, known as José Falcón (30 August 1944 – 11 August 1974) was a Portuguese matador whose bullfighting career spanned just over a decade. As of 2011, he was the last matador to be killed in the ring.

Born in Aldeia de Póvoas, Vila Franca de Xira, Falcão made his first public appearance at a bullfighting event in Montijo, Portugal, close to his hometown on 20 May 1962. He became a popular matador and on 15 May 1967 he appeared in a Spanish bullfight at Mérida. During a professional 12-year bullfighting career he headlined many events including 30 in Spain between 1969 and 1970 alone and afterwards showcased his talents in Mexico on 13 December 1970 in an event with Joaquín Bernadó.

Falcão's career came to an abrupt end in August 1974 in Barcelona after being gored in the leg by the bull while working with the muleta. He might have survived the ordeal had he not insisted on killing the bull before being treated for his wound, which had worsened as the fight continued and the artery in his leg ruptured. He died, aged 29, a few hours after being gored.

== See also ==
- Forcado
- Portuguese bullfighting
