= Grande Hotel da Póvoa =

Hotel in Portugal

Coordinates: 41.3789°N 8.7667°W

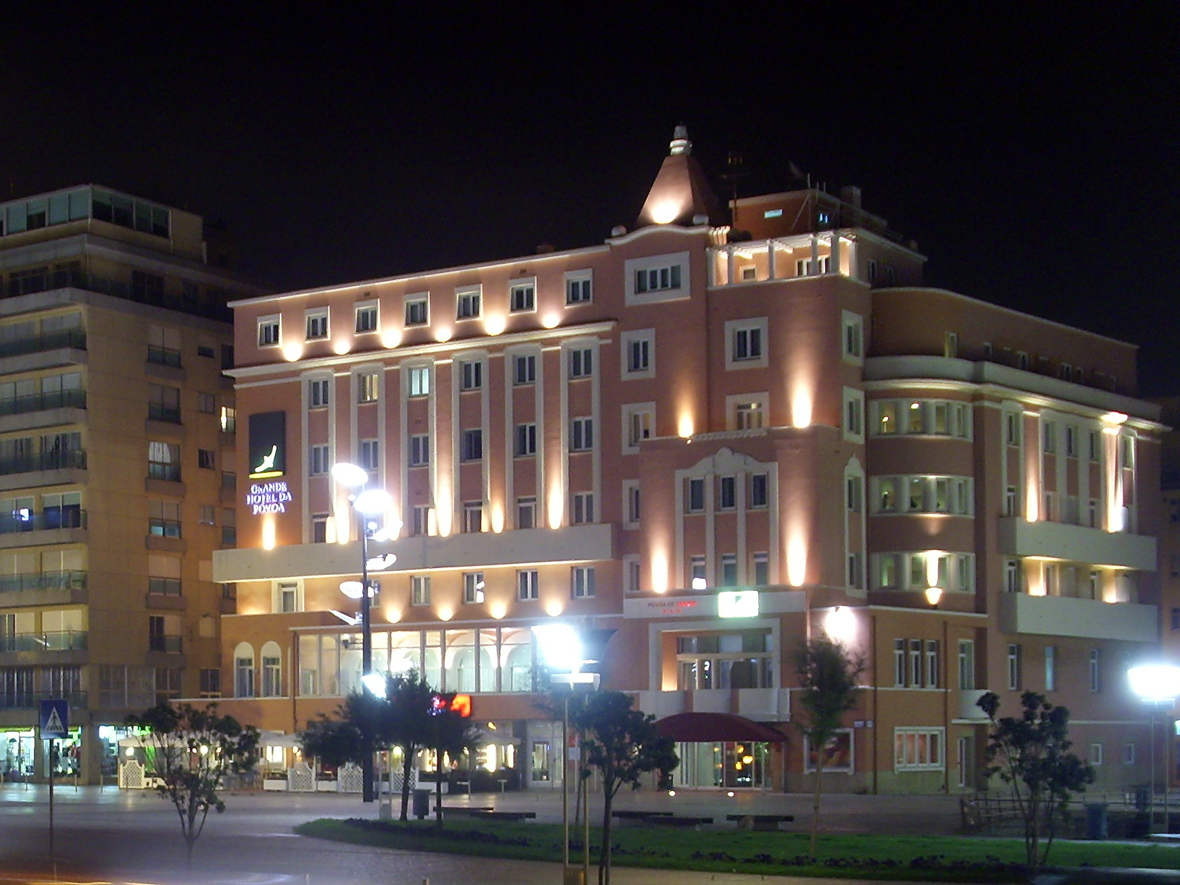
Grande Hotel da Póvoa.

Grande Hotel da Póvoa, in earlier times Palace Hotel, is a historic hotel located in Póvoa de Varzim, Portugal. It has a modernist style of great impact and is located at Passeio Alegre square, in Póvoa de Varzim City Center waterfront.

The façade and cover were designed by architect Rogério de Azevedo, a prominent New State architect, who also designed Casino da Póvoa.

== History ==
The hotel was built in early 1930s, was grouped in the same project as Casino da Póvoa, built during the same time. This hotel and casino project was during this period one of the largest investments in Portugal. In 1931, Rogério de Azevedo had substituted the early architect responsible for the project, José Coelho. Rogério de Azevedo was influenced by his master José Marques da Silva, and by the French and Flemish Renaissance while studying in Paris. Rogério de Azevego was a notable architect who designed the Comércio do Porto building in Porto and, in Póvoa, participated in the restoration works of the Monastery of Rates church, an ancient Romanesque site.

The Casino-Hotel project was overseen by Empresa de Turismo Praia Póvoa de Varzim, who got the gambling license. Both the casino and the hotel were later managed by Sopete, a Povoan tourism company that changed the name from Palace Hotel to Grande Hotel, and the later name kept being popularly used even when Accor hotels re-branded it as Mercure Hotel. It was bought by Grupo Elpo Hotéis in late 2000s, that changed the name back to Grande Hotel da Póvoa.

Grande Hotel da Póvoa was listed by IGESPAR, the Portuguese national monuments institute, along with other buildings in Passeio Alegre as an urban site of public importance in 1977.
