= List of people from Póvoa de Varzim =

The people listed below were all born in, residents of, or otherwise closely associated with Póvoa de Varzim, Portugal.

== Saints and religion ==
- Saint Peter of Rates (? — 60), Catholic saint; mythology
- Saint Felix the Hermit (9th century?), Catholic saint; mythology
- Blessed Alexandrina of Balazar (1904 — 1955), Catholic mystic
- José da Sacra Família (1788 — 1858), friar and Catholic missionary
- D. Joaquim Gonçalves (1936, Fafe — 2013, Póvoa de Varzim), bishop

== Literature ==
- Gomes de Amorim (1827 — 1891), poet
- Eça de Queiroz (1845 — 1900), novelist
- Agustina Bessa-Luís
- Camilo Castelo Branco
- Daniel Hompesch (1948, Liege — 2017, Póvoa de Varzim), painter

== Discovery Age & imperialism ==
- Tomé de Sousa (1503 — 1579), first general-governor of Brazil
- Diogo Dias de São Pedro, captain of the Portuguese armada, liberator of Bahia, Brazil
- António Cardia, Judge/Mayor of Póvoa de Varzim, liberator of Pernambuco, Brazil
- Garcia d'Ávila, Bandeirante in Brazil

== Ethnography and local politics ==
Relevant people on subjects of local importance, such as ethnographic studies, history and politics:

- Cego do Maio (1817 — 1884), local hero and fisherman
- António Augusto da Rocha Peixoto (1866 — 1909), naturalist and ethnologist
- David José Alves (1866 — 1924), politician
- António dos Santos Graça (1882 — 1956), ethnologist
- Elísio Martins da Nova, radio-telegrafist of the Portuguese armada
- Manuel Silva (1869 — 1941), historian
- Maria da Paz Varzim, creator of the Maria da Paz Varzim Institute

== Politics and economics ==
- Diogo Freitas do Amaral (b. 1941), politician, founder of the CDS party, former prime minister and minister
- Tavares Moreira (b. 1944), economist and former president of the Bank of Portugal
- Miguel Cadilhe (b. 1944), economist and former finance minister
- Manuel Francisco de Almeida Brandão (1837-1902), capitalist, Portuguese Progressist party, mayor of Póvoa de Varzim

== Television ==
- Sandra Sousa, TV presenter, journalist

== Sports ==
- Alves brothers
  - Bruno Alves
  - Geraldo Alves (footballer, born 1980)
  - Júlio Regufe Alves
- Rui Costa (cyclist)
- Hélder Postiga
- Fábio Coentrão
- Bino (footballer)
- António Lima Pereira
- Aurora Cunha
