= Póvoa de Varzim Bullfighting Arena =

Bullfighting arena in Norte, Portugal

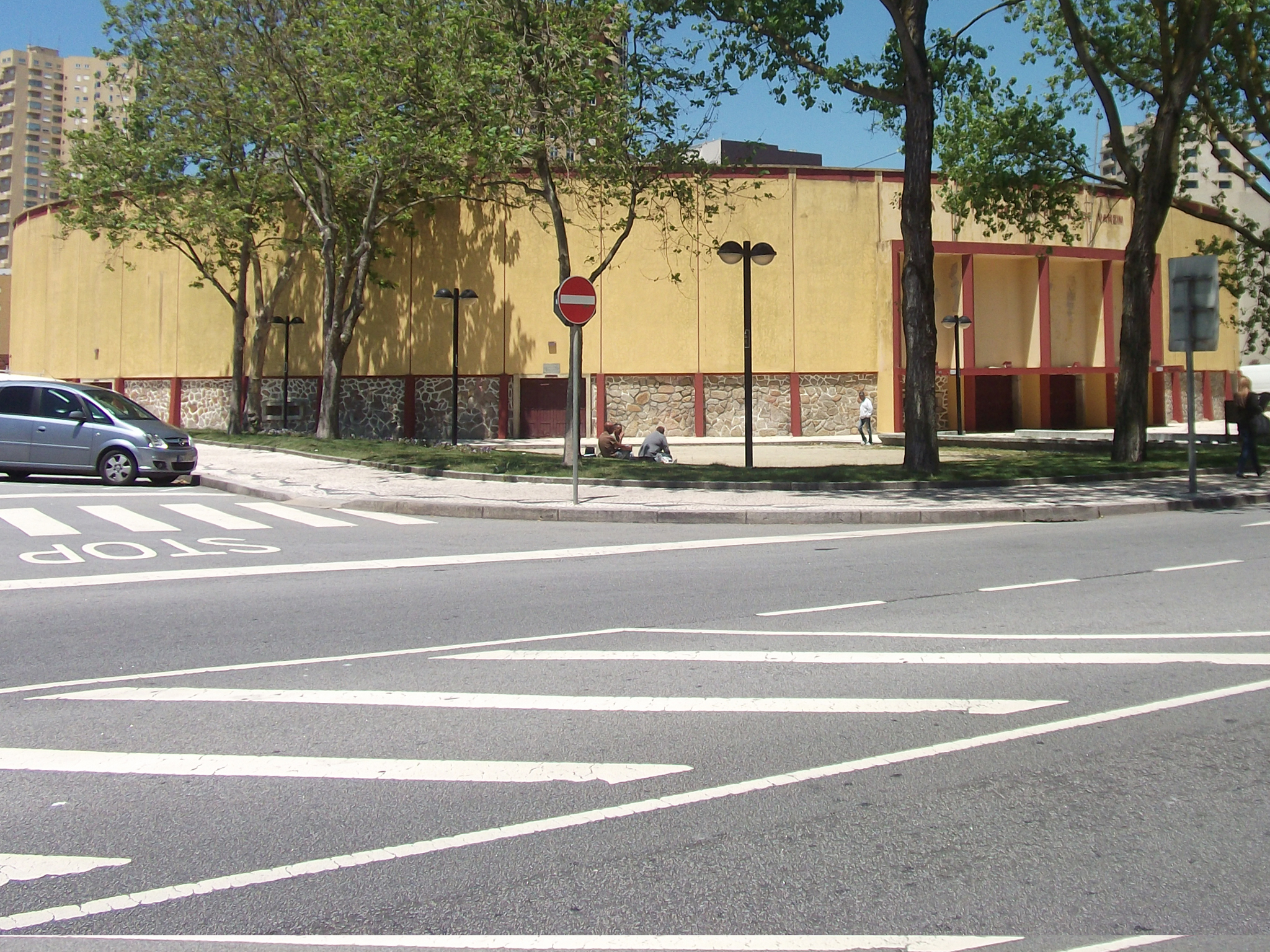
- Póvoa de Varzim Bullring in Avenida Vasco da Gama.
- Interactive map of the Póvoa de Varzim Bullfighting Arena area

General information
- Status: Closed in 2019; Demolished in 2023
- Type: Bullring
- Construction started: 1949
- Opened: 1949

Other information
- Seating capacity: 5500

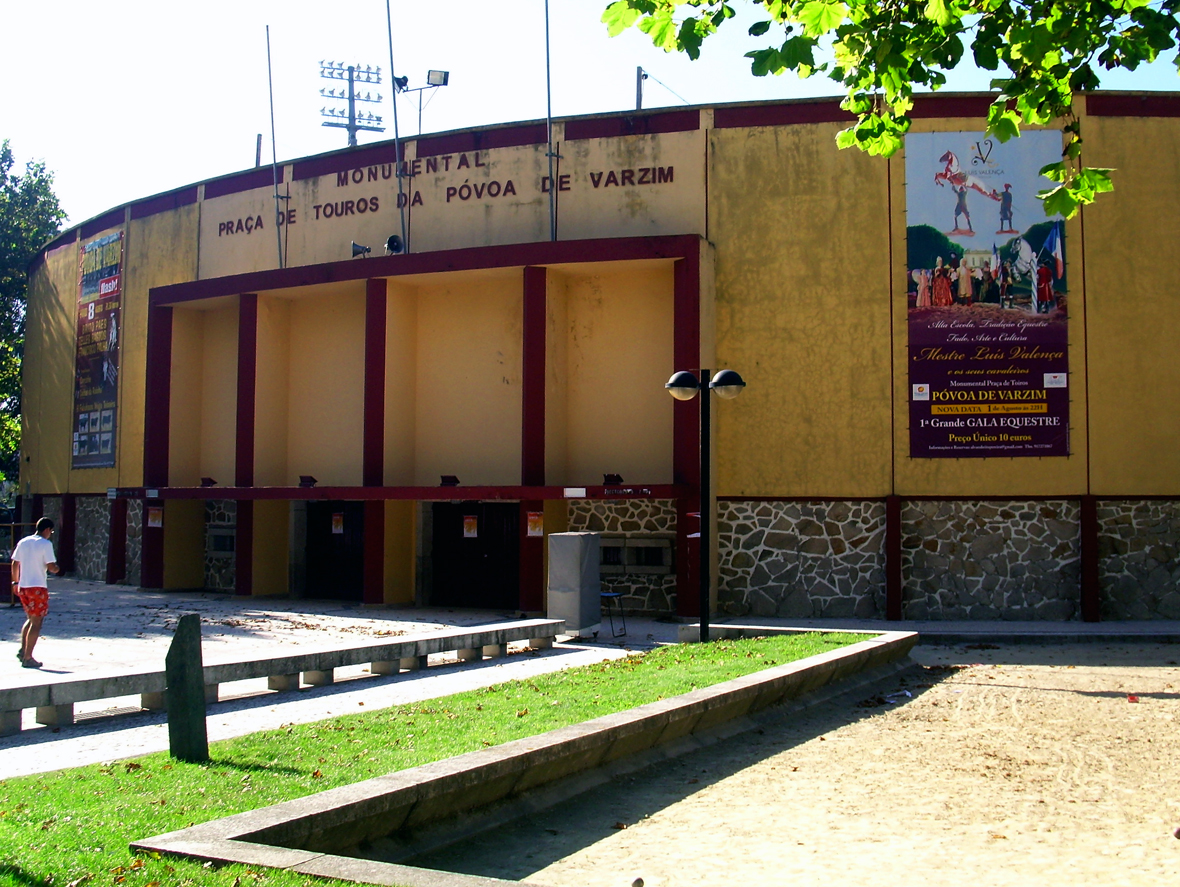
Façade billboard promoting the Grande Gala Equestre horse show.

Póvoa de Varzim Bullfighting Arena (Portuguese: Monumental Praça de Touros da Póvoa de Varzim) was a bullring (Portuguese: Praça de Touros) in Póvoa de Varzim, Portugal. It was located on Avenida Vasco da Gama, on the northern waterfront of the city. Bullfighting, horse shows, and concerts are held in the arena.

The arena opened in 1949 and has a seating capacity of 6,097 regular seats and 150 chairs. Since 1984, it is a municipal venue owned by Varzim Lazer, a municipal company. It was built using functionalist architecture with a tendency to geometrical artistic expression.

Póvoa de Varzim Bullring had the most important bullfighting tradition in Northern Portugal, some of its Portuguese-style corridas were broadcast in national television and some of its events met with strong opposition from animal welfare activists, such as the Portuguese group Animal and PETA. The bullring included the Salvação Barreto Bullfighting Museum, paying homage to the creator and manager of the bullring and a mythical forcado or bull-grabber who participated in the 1951 epic Quo Vadis as a gladiator fighting a bull.

The Póvoa de Varzim Bullfighting Arena was demolished. The demolition started September, 2022, after a multi-year legal dispute involving a court injunction. It was replaced on the same site by the modern Póvoa Arena, a covered multi-purpose venue with a capacity of around 3,000 spectators, intended for concerts, exhibitions, conferences, sports events, catering and retail.

This transformation followed the municipality's decision to declare Póvoa de Varzim an anti-bullfighting city as of January 1, 2019, banning shows involving animal cruelty in all municipal venues. The mayor justified the decision by pointing to a significant drop in interest in bullfighting in northern Portugal — with attendance reportedly decreasing by around 50% between 2012 and 2019 — and growing social opposition to such practices.

== History ==
=== Early arenas ===
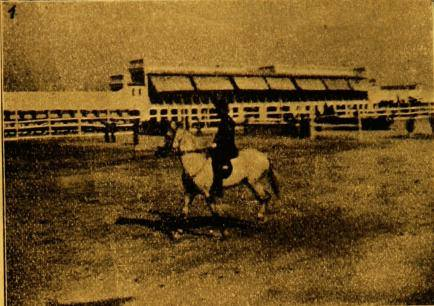
Horse show in Velodromo (1911-1925) in Alto de Martim Vaz. The venue was replaced by Gomes de Amorim stadium, where bullfighting is known.

The existence of a bullring in Póvoa de Varzim is attested in the 1793 celebrations of the birth of Teresa of Braganza, daughter of King John VI. The wooden bullring was located in Campo das Cobras (Snakes field). In the 19th century, bullfighting and horse shows occurred in Castelo da Póvoa fortress.

=== Permanent location and increasing popularity ===
In Alto de Martim Vaz, at the beginning of the 20th century, the Gomes de Amorim stadium was used as a bullfighting arena and for horse shows. The project for a permanent bullring in Póvoa de Varzim occurred during the Estado Novo regime, under the influence of Salvação Barreto, a notable forcado, the manager of Casino da Póvoa. The contemporary and functionalist project was designed by architect Alfredo Coelho de Magalhães in February 1949 and located just off Alto de Martim Vaz. It was owned by Empresa de Recreios da Póvoa de Varzim, ltd.

The bullring was built using stone and concrete, with the exception of the tiered rows of stands built as a wood structure. Nevertheless, the project allowed later changes in the stands structure. Construction was fast, its popularity also came fast. The first corrida took place on June 19, 1949, with a competition between the bullfighting horsemen (cavaleiros): Simão da Veiga Jr. and José Rosa Rodrigues, the matadores Manuel dos Santos e Manolo Navarro, and the great bull-grabbers of Santarém, Alpoim, Gois and Correia. During bullfighting afternoons, Póvoa got thousands of visitors from South and Northern Portugal and Spain.

Salvação Barreto participated in the 1951 American film Quo Vadis. The action takes place in ancient Rome and Salvação Barreto staged as a gladiator fighting a bull and saving a lady that was thrown to the beasts. In 1959, the rows of stands were rebuilt using concrete, a work by the engineer Mário Fernandes da Ponte, keeping the same total capacity, without any other changes. With the knowledge and passion of Artur Aires and Salvação Barreto, the bullring had some of the most glorious days of the Portuguese bullfighting history.

=== Acquisition by the city hall ===
It was bought by the City Hall of Póvoa de Varzim on May 23, 1984 to Empresa de Recreios da Póvoa de Varzim. The purchase included the book and museum collection of the Bullfighting Library Biblioteca Tauromática, an offer to the city by Salvação Barreto. The library and museum are housed in the bullring since 1962. The city hall paying homage to Salvação Barreto named the bullfighting museum as Museu Tauromático Salvação Barreto. The Clube Taurino Povoense group was created in 1994 in Rua dos Pescadores aiming to preserve the bullfighting activities.

=== Corrida TV Norte, Brazilian rodeos and the anti-bullfighting movement ===
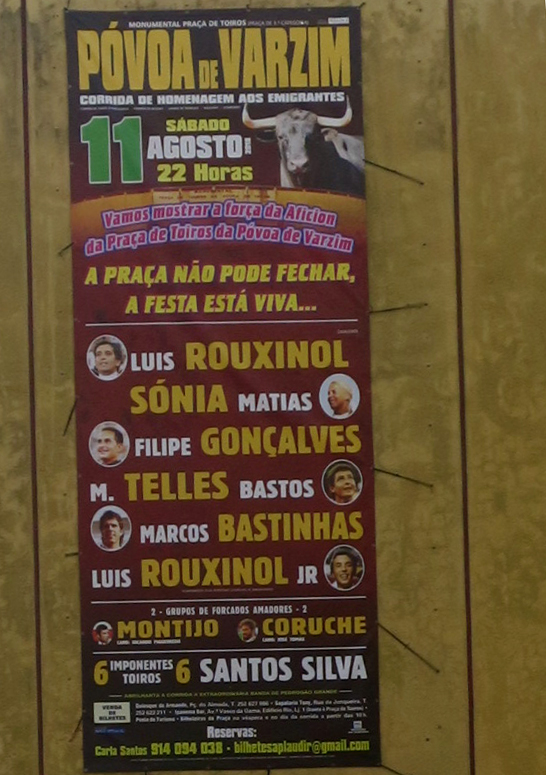
August 2018 Bullfighting giant poster in the arena's wall.

A project to build a roof over the bullring was presented in late 20th century by the German engineer Rudolf Bergman, who designed the roof of the Olympic Stadium in Berlin and the Waldstation in Frankfurt. The engineer's project included bars, restaurants and other services, and was considered relevant for tourism, but the project was canceled due to lack of funding. In 2008, a German businessman, supporting the end of bullfighting, proposed to transform the Praça into a biergarten, a leisure, entertainment and culture venue similar to the one in Munich in Germany.

The importance that the local bullfighting shows had for the popularity of tauromachy in Northern Portugal, with Corrida TV Norte being one of the most important national corridas, and the creation of a new non-traditional show, the Brazilian rodeo that in the II Rodeo Country Bulls (2004), increased the outcry of animal welfare associations, Brazilian rodeos stopped being presented, but this didn't stopped that PETA (People for the Ethical Treatment of Animals), a major international organization, the Portuguese Animal and the Scottish Advocate for Animals protesting there during the 2005 Corrida TV Norte. Between 1997 and 2015, a Garraida was held in the Póvoa de Varzim arena, with young bulls and higher education students. It occurred in early May as part of Porto's student festivities - the Queima das Fitas. This was not a violent bullfight, but rather playing with bulls and part of Porto's student festivities since 1948. These ended following student pressure, regular protests near the bullring and declining student attendance.

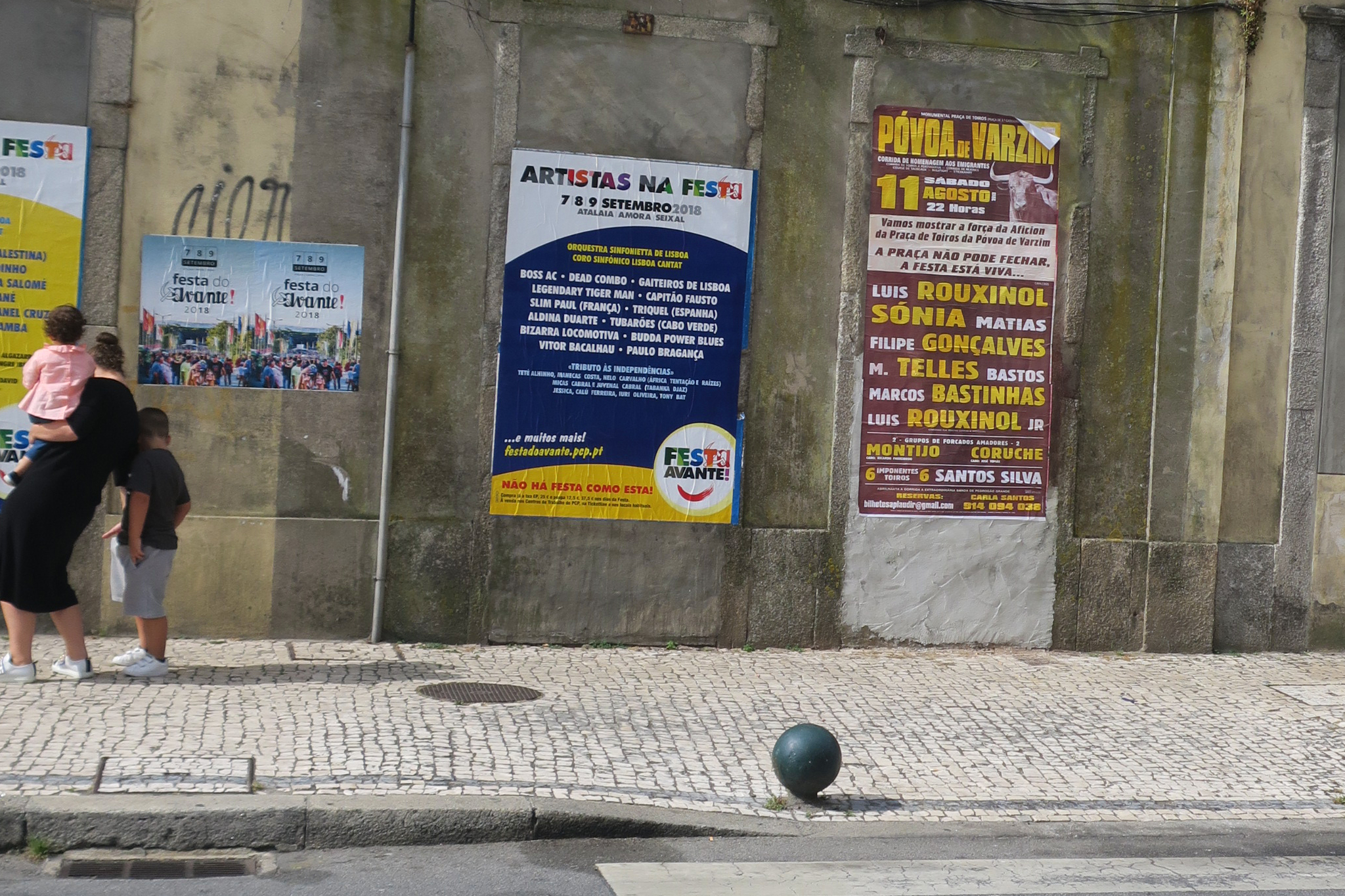
2018 Bullfighting poster in Rua Tenente Valadim. This bullfight was considered the last one, prior to the ban.

== Opposition to bullfighting and demolition ==
Bullfighting in Portugal has faced opposition throughout its history, with resistance present nationwide. In particular, northern regions such as Porto and Póvoa de Varzim have demonstrated strong local opposition. For example, in the city of Porto, early petitions against bullfighting date back to 1874, reflecting persistent local resistance. Throughout the twentieth century, several attempts to establish permanent bullrings in Porto failed due to lack of popular support.

A notable recent episode occurred in 1993, when a bullfight organized in a temporary venue in Porto was met with strong local opposition, including clashes with organizers and police intervention. This event underscored the enduring rejection of bullfighting in the region and contributed to the wider decline of the tradition in northern Portugal.

Bullfighting in Póvoa de Varzim faced growing opposition during the 2010s, driven by increasing concerns over animal welfare and a declining public interest in the tradition. The rise of the People–Animals–Nature (PAN) party in the 2017 local elections, which became the fourth most-voted party in the city hall, reflected this shift. Following local pressure and plans to transform the arena into a multi-use venue, the Póvoa de Varzim city hall banned bullfights and other violent shows against animals starting from January 1, 2019.

This ban faced legal challenges by the bullfighting association Prótoiro, who argued that bullfighting is part of Portuguese culture. The legal dispute delayed the demolition of the old bullring and the construction of the new multi-use arena, increasing costs by approximately 3 million euros. The mayor of Póvoa de Varzim, Aires Pereira, stated publicly that "the judicial processes have had a significant impact on the timeline and the financial costs of the project, delaying the delivery of a much-needed multi-purpose facility for the community."

The old bullring was demolished in 2023, making way for the Póvoa Arena, inaugurated on 5 July 2025 as a modern multi-purpose venue during the city's São Pedro festivities. The project, described by the Mayor Aires Pereira as the most controversial and long-lasting in the city's history, has now become a regional landmark.

== Events ==
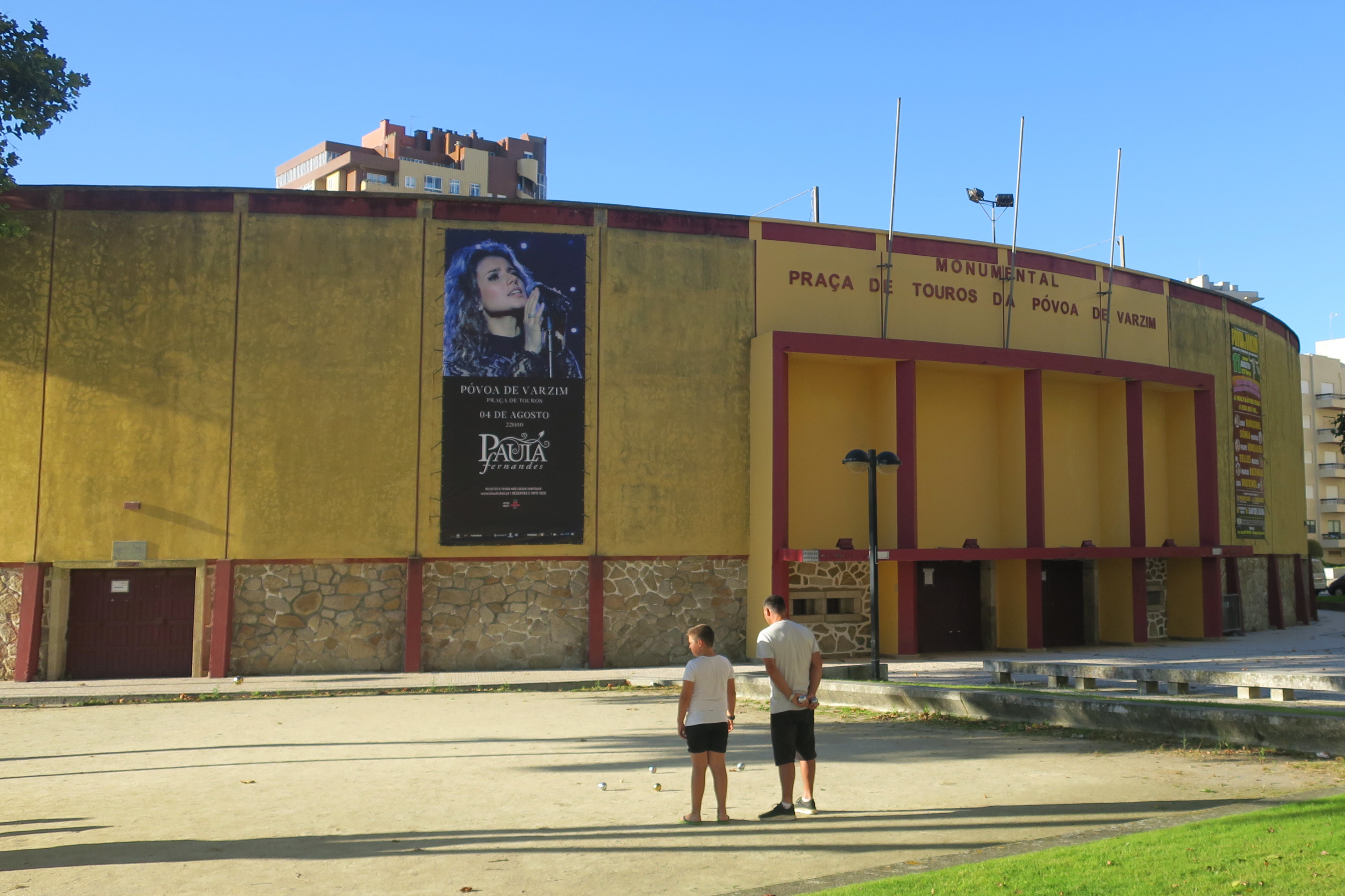
Paula Fernandes music concert poster held in the arena in August 2018. The Arena's square is regularly used in the summer for Boules games by French and Portuguese-French visitors.

The most important run in the bullring was a Portuguese-style bullfighting known as Grande Corrida TV Norte (TV's Great Run - North) in late July by the Portuguese public broadcaster, RTP. Several others were held till 2018, including an 18th-century-style show with horsewomen.

The bullring also hosted a popular music show in the summer - the Noites de Verão (Summer evenings), quite popular in Coastal Northern Portugal, with popular music sung in Portuguese, mostly with famed Portuguese and Brazilian musicians. The event is organized by Rádio Onda Viva and held since the late 1990s.
