= Avenida Vasco da Gama =

Major street in Portugal

Coordinates: 41.38806°N 8.76725°W

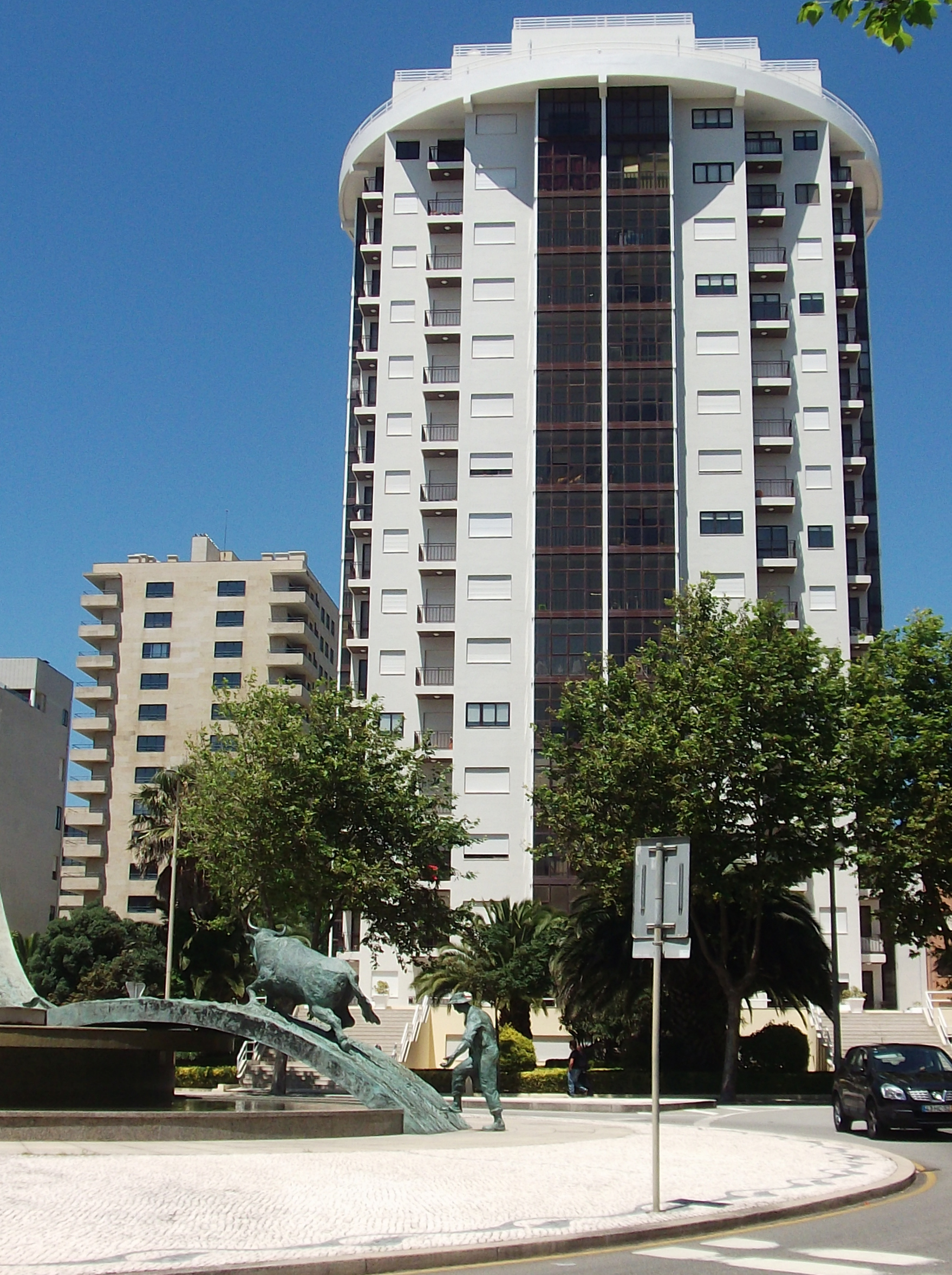
Touro intersection. Cristal Mar (1992) and São Pedro (2002) towers.

Avenida Vasco da Gama is a street in the north central area of Póvoa de Varzim, Portugal. It is one of the main avenues in the city, with hotels, banks, sports areas, bars and is the location in the city with most high-rises. It runs from Avenida do Mar, expansion of the avenue to A28 Motorway (freeway), and Rua Gomes de Amorim (EN 13 National Highway) to Avenida dos Banhos in the waterfront. It has some of Póvoa de Varzim's most famous landmarks such as Touro and Póvoa de Varzim Bullring.

== History ==
In the waterfront area where Avenida Vasco da Gama now stands vestiges of a Roman fish factory and surrounding houses were found and was widely publicized as the Roman core of Póvoa de Varzim (Villa Euracini), although currently historians and archaeologists place the core of the city in the Old Town Póvoa de Varzim, but it then proved that Póvoa de Varzim was much older than it was thought in the early years of the 20th century.

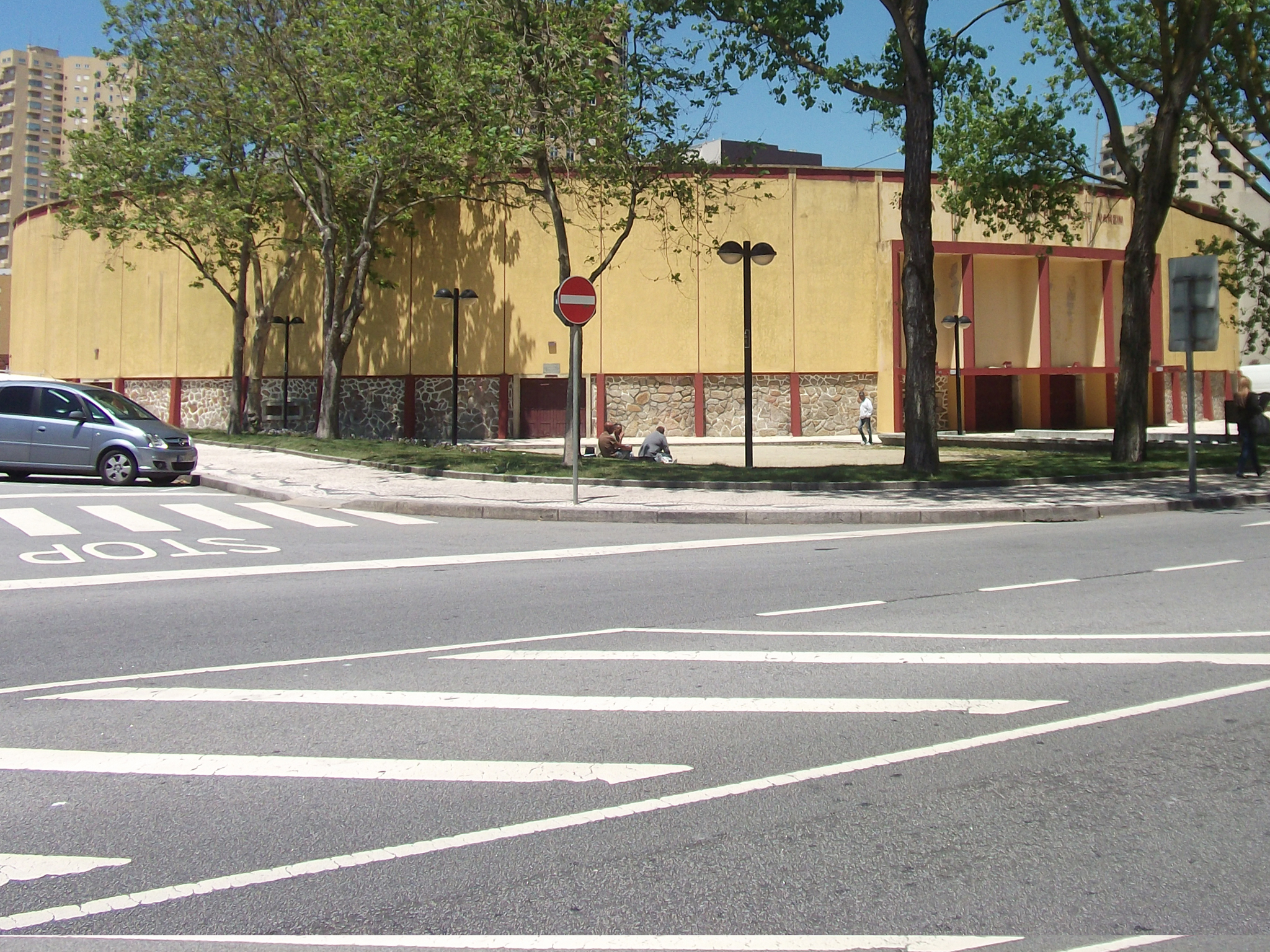
Póvoa de Varzim Bullring is historical for the Portuguese bullfighting. Its manager, Salvação Barreto, presented his skills in the 1951 epic Quo Vadis staging as a gladiator.

Modern development started early in the 20th century and before Avenida Vasco da Gama opened, due to the north expansion of Avenida dos Banhos, in an area called Largo Dr. José Pontes. The Velódromo cycle track opened in 1925, which was later transformed into Gomes de Amorim Stadium, venue of Sporting Club da Póvoa (founded in 1916 and extinct in the 1940s). Estádio do Varzim Sport Club was built in 1929 and the club exists since 1915. Gomes de Amorim stadium was later demolished and in its place the Póvoa de Varzim swimming pool complex and Tennis court were built. The Bullring opened in 1949.

In 1950, an underdeveloped and serpent-shaped street already existed in the area of the avenue and in much of its extension coincided with modern Avenida Vasco da Gama. In 1975, modern Vasco da Gama was already built and was planned to be the new city entry, with venues in the north side and buildings already existed in the south side from the waterfront to the bullring and by Gomes de Amorim street and the avenue got its modern shape. The high-rise urbanization of Vasco da Gama took place in the early 1980s and it was completely urbanized by 1986, excepting for a small north side area, near the current Touro square, as it was the location where itinerant circus were placed.

Due to planned relocation of some sports venues to Póvoa de Varzim City Park, a plan named Plano de Pormenor da Zona E54 (PPZE54) aiming for further development and underground parking was subject to public discussion and approved by the city hall in 2009.

== Urban morphology ==
Vasco da Gama avenue is a small avenue but holds several high-rise buildings. Floor counting is not universal, as the first floor is counted as R/C and some buildings have a non-residential attic often relegated from floor-counting. Some of its high-rises include Cristal Mar (16 residential floors, but 18 floors above ground). Other high-rises include Eça de Queiroz with 18 residential floors, Hotel Costa Verde (14) and according to the urbanization plan there are 10 high-rises (with at least 11 residential floors) in the avenue area alone, not counting buildings that almost meet the cut and those in nearby streets which rely on Vasco da Gama for transportation, such as Nova Póvoa tower, the tallest building of Póvoa de Varzim (accounted to have 28 residential floors and 30 floors above ground). The avenue is considered too cramped for the buildings it serves.
