= Touro (sculpture) =

Monument in Portugal

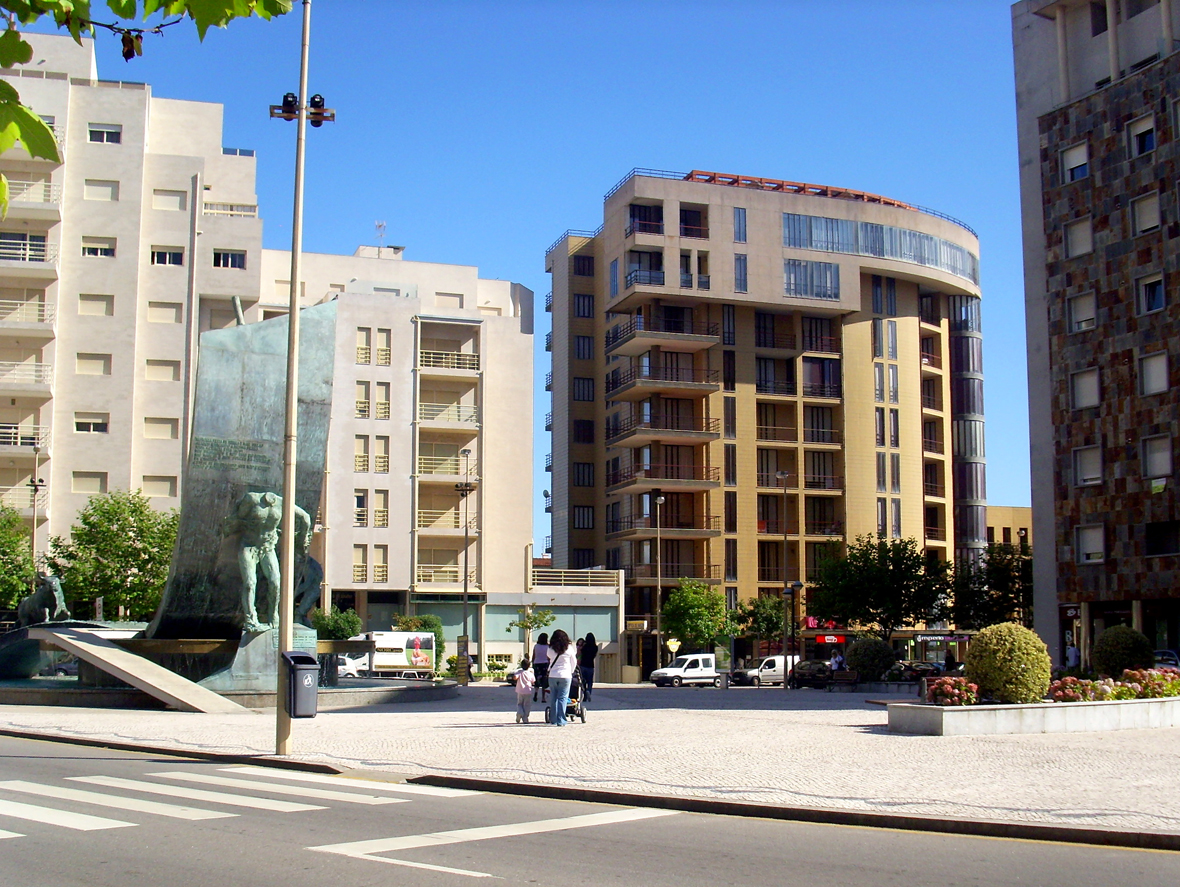
Touro square.

Touro (Portuguese for "bull"; Monument to the Peoples of Póvoa de Varzim; Portuguese: Monumento às Gentes da Póvoa de Varzim) is a bronze sculpture in Póvoa de Varzim, Portugal. The monument is located in an intersection, a square also popularly known as Touro, at the junction of Vasco da Gama Avenue and Repatriamento dos Poveiros Avenue.

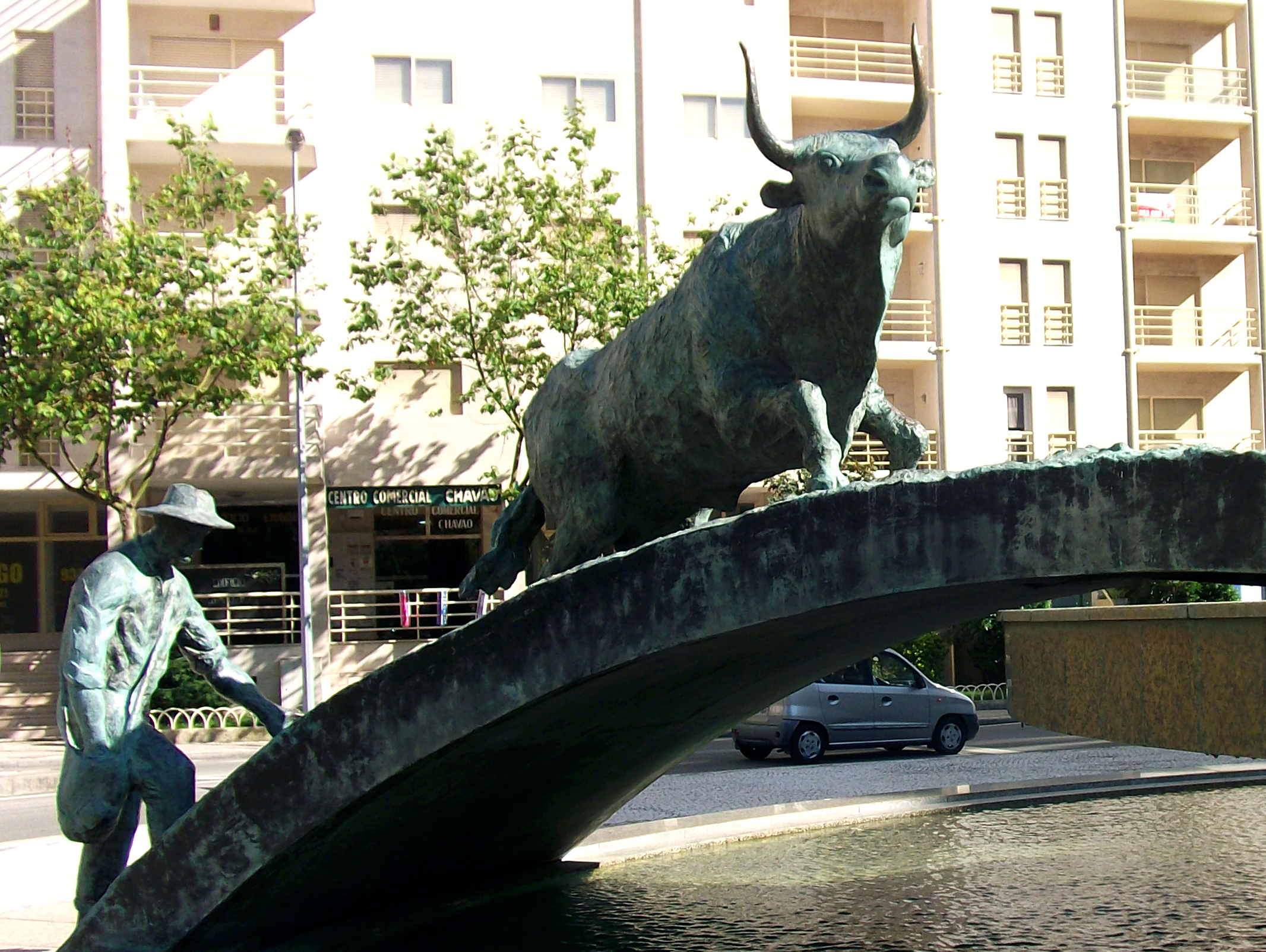
The bull (Touro).

The monument was built in 1995 by the sculptor Rui Anahory, who gained some fame due to this monument. The monument was built by the Rotary Clube of Póvoa de Varzim with the support of City Hall.

Its popular name derives from the full-sized realistic and stylized sculpture of a bull, one of the elements of the monument, which lead some to relate the monument with bullfighting and the nearby Póvoa de Varzim Bullfighting Arena, hence the popular name of the monument and the square. The monument actually represents the peoples of Póvoa de Varzim, their unity and their differences: The sail and the fisherman representing the coastal people, the farmer and the bull, representing the inland people. According to the author and José Hermano Saraiva, the headless giant supporting the structure represents a people that spread around the world with the Portuguese discoveries, thus a giant, but themselves of unknown origins (headless).
