= Forcado =

Portuguese bullfighters

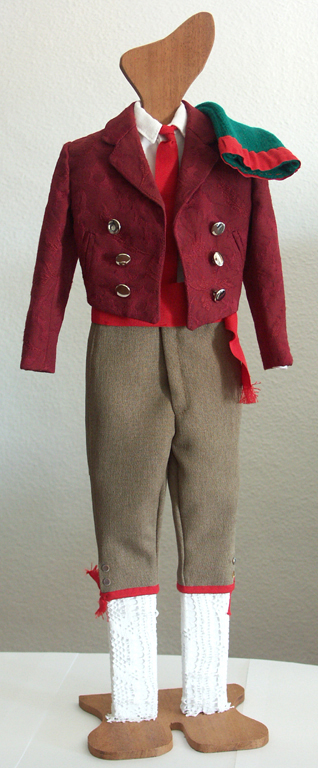
Traditional forcado costume.

A forcado (European Portuguese: [fuɾˈkaðu]) is a member of a group of men that performs the pega de cara or pega de caras ("face catch"), the final event in a typical Portuguese bullfight. The only Spanish-style bullfighting where forcados may also be present are Mexican bullfights. Forcados were initially professionals from lower classes but nowadays people from all social backgrounds practice their art through amateur groups.

== Origin ==
In past times the bullring had a staircase to the royal cabin and forcados were employed to ensure that the bull did not enter the stairs. To assist them they used a pole (approx 1.7 m or 5 ft 7 in long) with a half-moon of steel at the top. This pole is called a "forcado" and it is from there the name comes. Nowadays, they only use a more symbolic, less functional version of it in the cortesias ("courtesies", the opening ceremony) or historical demonstrations.

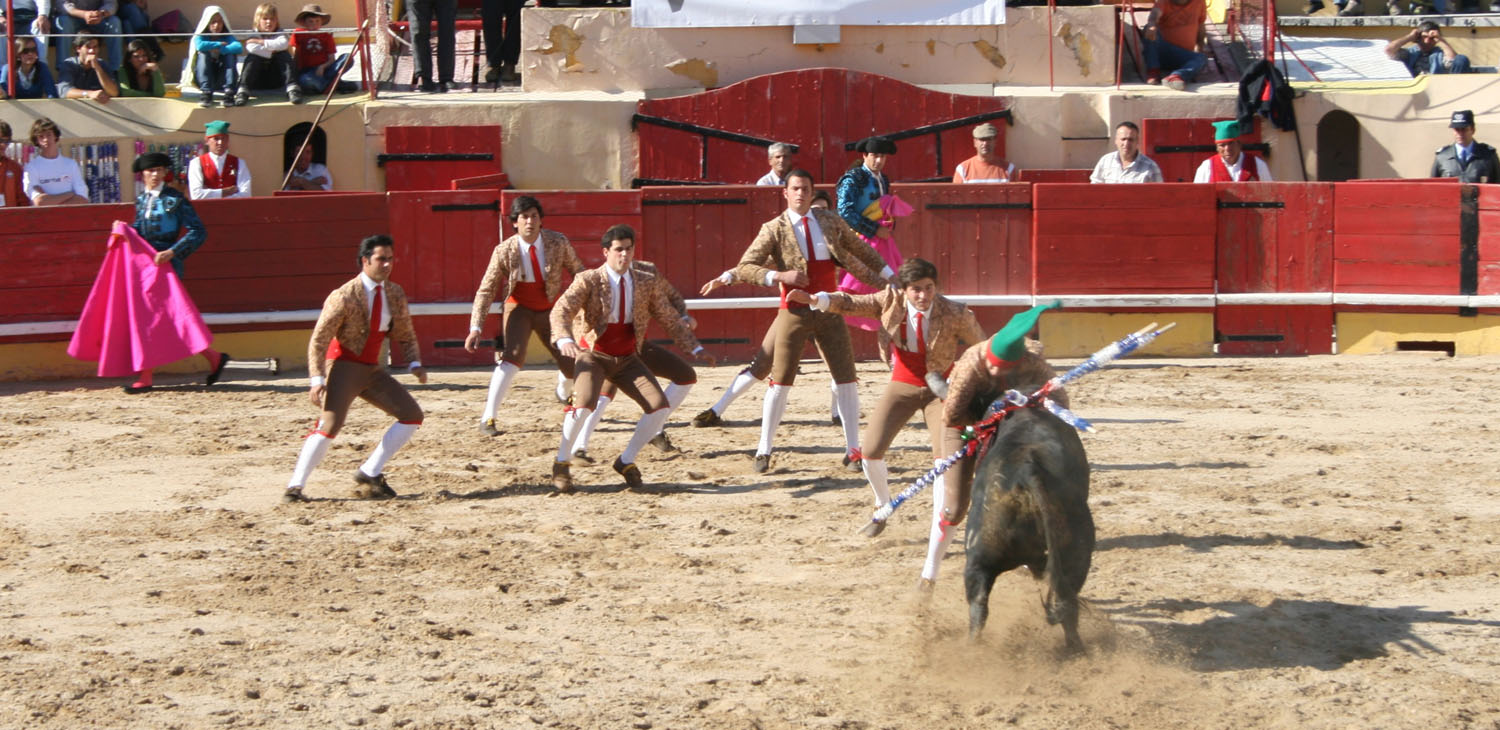
Pega de caras (face catch) at Cartaxo.

== Role ==
The pega involves eight forcados who challenge the bull with their bare hands. They form a line facing the bull and the forcado da cara (front man) eggs the bull on by "playing" with it and taking steps forward if necessary to get it to charge. Once the bull runs forward the first forcado times his hold of the bull's head. Once on the bull's head and holding onto it, usually around its neck, six forcados jump upon the bull piling upon themselves and grabbing the bull while one forcado grabs the bull by its tail. The objective is to subdue the bull, to stop it. The forcado who grabbed the bull by the tail (rabejador) is the last one to release the bull after it is subdued. Bull's horns are covered with a protection of leather to prevent it from injuring forcados. Although in popular street bullfights some bulls are released without any protection at all - "em pontas".

== Clothing ==
Forcados appear in traditional clothing for this event, including a green, long, knit hat. The campinos, who also traditionally wear the knit hats, are also present at the arena to herd the bull back to its pen at the end of the corrida. The forcados do not wear the hat on their heads, they carry it on their shoulders in the cortesias. During the pega, only the forcado da cara wears it.

== Risks ==
Forcados are often seriously injured (in 2008 at least one forcado was in a coma for three days) or even killed.

== Groups ==
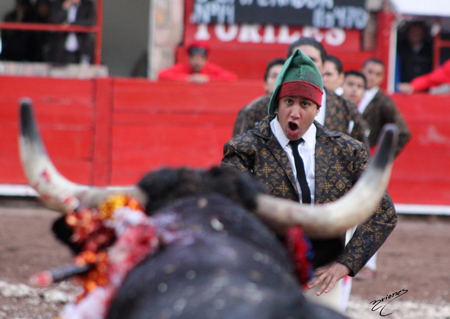
Forcados de Mazatlán performing in Zacatecas, México.

The oldest forcado group is Grupo de Forcados Amadores de Santarém Santarém, Portugal. It has been practicing this art uninterruptedly since 1915.

== See also ==
- Campino
- Bullfighting
- Portuguese-style bullfighting
- List of bullfighters
- Portugal
