= David José Alves =

Portuguese politician

David Alves (1866–1924) was a Portuguese politician of Partido Regenerador during the constitutional monarchy. He became known after solving the crisis of the tragedy of Póvoa de Varzim in 1892, when hundreds of fishermen died near the shoreline.
