= Portuguese-style bullfighting =

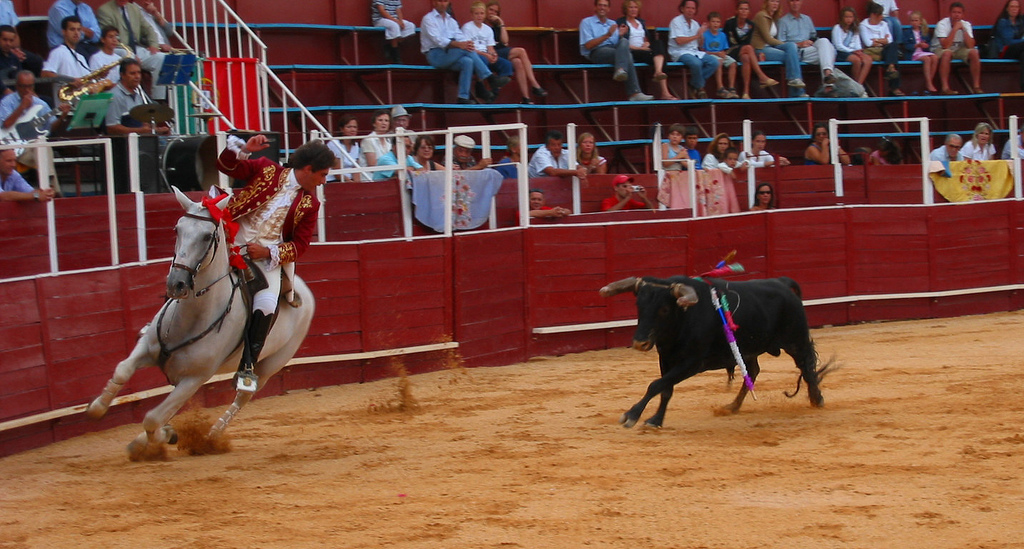
Cavaleiro and bull

Portuguese-style bullfighting (Portuguese: touradas) differs in many aspects from Spanish-style bullfighting, most notably in the fact that the bull is not killed in front of an audience in the arena. The cavaleiros and the forcados are unique to the Portuguese variety of bullfighting, as well as the participation of horsewomen (cavaleiras) in the routines.

== Main figures ==
- Cavaleiros - A horseman or horsewoman (rider), dressed in traditional 18th century costume, antagonizes a bull while on horseback. The horses are of the Lusitano breed, specially-trained for these “fights”. The horses are usually skilled in dressage, and may exhibit their art at points in the spectacle. The purpose of the bullfight is to pin three or four bandarilhas (small spears) in the back of the bull. In the past, cavaleiros were often members of older, aristocratic families. The horsewomen, the cavaleiras, are pioneers and became a unique feature of Portuguese bullfighting. Ana Batista, Sónia Matias, Ana Rita and Joana Andrade were among the first and most-renowned cavaleiras of Portugal.
- Forcados - The forcados are a group of eight men who challenge the bull directly, on foot, without any protection or weapons for defense. The first man tempts the bull into a charge to perform a pega de cara (face catch), or pega de caras (faces catch). The front man secures the animal's head, usually by its horns, and he is quickly aided by his fellow forcados, who surround and secure the animal until it is subdued. Forcados were usually people from lower classes who, to this day, practice their art through amateur associations.
- Matadores - the same role as the Spanish matadores; however, they do not kill the bull.
- Bandarilheiros - the matadore’s and/or cavaleiro's assistance in the arena. They are skillful and wear the suit of light as the matador, sans the gold sequins. While in the arena, they display the gold and pink cape to distract or tempt the bull.

== Stages ==
=== Corridas de touros ===
Most Portuguese bullfights (corridas de touros) are held in two phases: the spectacle of the cavaleiro, followed by the pega. In Portugal, the main stars of bullfighting are the cavaleiros, as opposed to Spain, where the matadores are the most prominent bullfighters. Nevertheless, bullfights with matadores are frequent, notably with Portuguese matadores who practice their trade in Spain and who, when in Portugal, replace the sword in their final strike with a bandarilha, a small type of spear. Examples of famous Portuguese matadores are Vítor Mendes and Pedrito de Portugal.

The spectacle starts with the cavaleiro, a horseman on a Lusitano specially trained for the fights, fighting the bull from horseback. The purpose of this fight is to stab three or four bandeirilhas in the back of the bull.

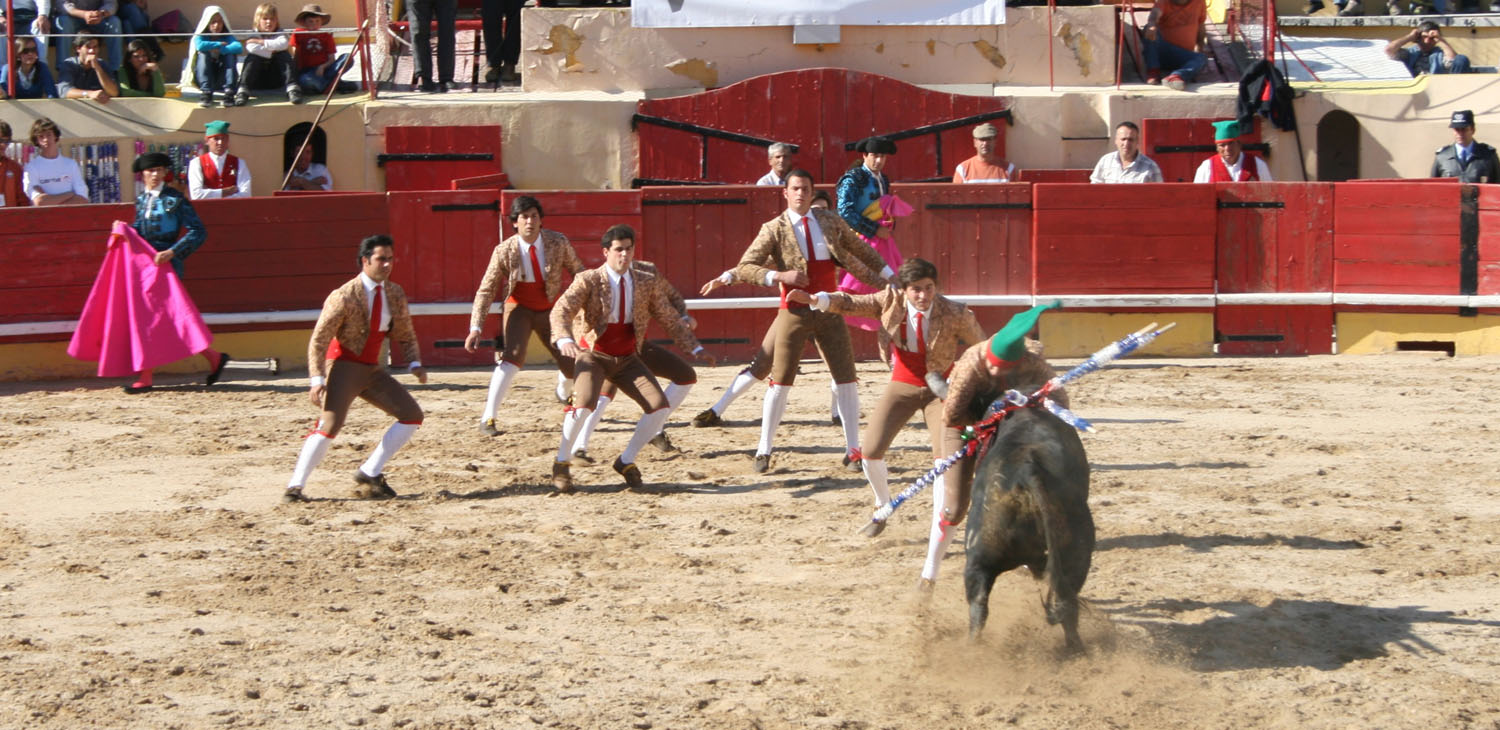
Pega de caras

In the second stage, called the pega, the forcados, a group of eight men, challenge the bull directly without any protection or weapon of defense. The front man provokes the bull into a charge to perform a pega de cara or pega de caras (face catch). The front man secures the animal's head and is quickly aided by his fellows who surround and secure the animal until he is subdued.

The bull is not killed, at the end of the corrida, leading oxen are let into the arena and two campinos on foot herd the bull along them back to its pen. After the fight the bull may be either killed by a professional butcher or, after a good performance, restored to health and released to pasture for breeding. Nevertheless, tradition was so strong at the small frontier town of Barrancos, where the bull was illegally killed, that the government was forced to relent and permit the town to follow its ancient matador tradition and kill the bull.

=== Tourada à corda ===
There are other forms of traditional bullfighting in Portugal, some differing markedly from the version described above. In the Azores, bullfighting is often reminiscent of the running of the bulls in Pamplona, Spain, in the respect that those most at risk are human beings, not the bulls themselves. The Azorean style involves a group of people vying in a tug-of-war with a young bull by holding fast to a long stout rope tied around the bull's neck. This is called the tourada à corda (bull-on-a-rope 'game'). Portuguese immigrants from the Azores also practice "tourada a corda" in the city of Brampton, southern Ontario, Canada.

== Hazards ==
In Portugal, some bulls have their horns trimmed, or simply covered, in a way that will not present any sharp points. This practice is believed to have been introduced in the 1700s by King Joseph I of Portugal, presiding at Salvaterra de Magos, after having witnessed a tragic accident during a bullfight; the son (and heir) of the Marquis of Marialva IV was fighting a bull on horseback when the animal wounded his horse, causing the young man to fall to the arena floor. He was then trampled and kicked to death. The Marquis himself, then around 70 years of age, leapt down from the royal seats that he shared with the King, drawing his sword and killing the bull, albeit several seconds too late.

== Legal status ==
=== Regional variation ===
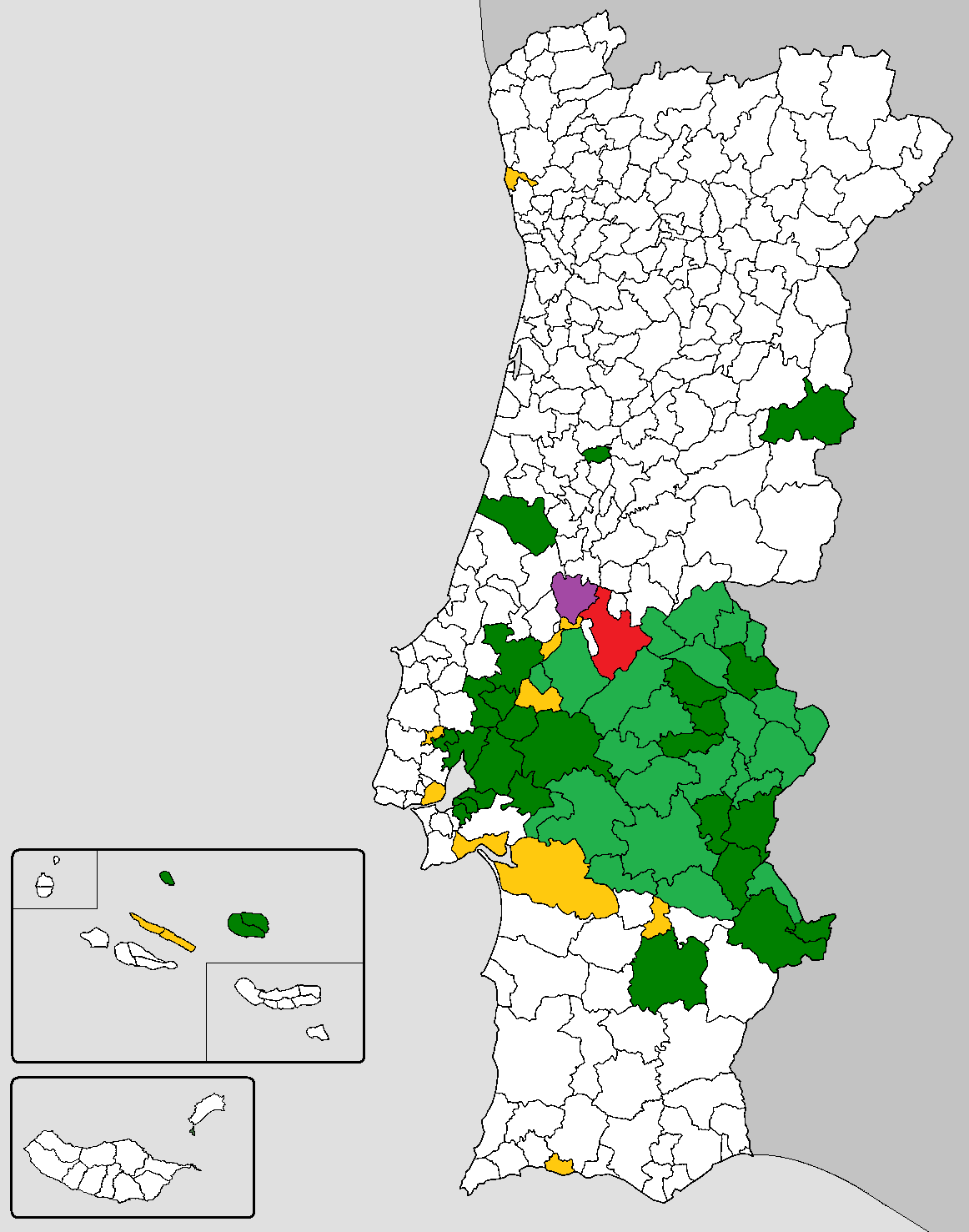
ANMP municipalities Non-ANMP municipalities that have declared tauromachy immaterial cultural heritage ANMP municipalities that have not declared tauromachy as immaterial cultural heritage. ANMP municipalities that have rejected to declare tauromachy as immaterial cultural heritage (Tomar). Non-ANMP municipalities that have rejected to declare tauromachy as immaterial cultural heritage (Abrantes).

Some southern and central regions of Portugal (such as Ribatejo and parts of the Alentejo), including Terceira Island, Azores, are traditionally more interested in the corrida de touros (running of the bulls) as opposed to bull-baiting or fighting. In the country’s northern regions, bullfighting has a much lower prevalence, except for Póvoa de Varzim, where bullfighting arenas have been known to exist in several areas since ca. the 18th century.

Some Portuguese municipalities have declared bullfighting “immaterial cultural heritage”, becoming members of the Section of Municipalities with Tauromachic Activities of the National Association of Portuguese Municipalities (ANMP); others have implicitly or explicitly refused to do so.

RTP has historically shown bullfights in prime-time; the practice has been widely criticized, with left-wing parties proposing legislation to prevent bullfighting being shown on the public broadcasting network or changing the rating of the show to an adults-only classification. RTP ceased to broadcast bullfights since 2021.

=== Attempts at prohibition ===
Queen Maria II of Portugal prohibited bullfighting in 1836 with the argument that it was unbefitting for a civilised nation. The ban was lifted in 1921, but in 1928 a law was passed that forbade the killing of the bull during a fight.

In 2001, matador Pedrito de Portugal controversially killed a bull at the end of a fight after spectators encouraged him to do so by chanting "Kill the bull! Kill the bull!" The crowds gave Pedrito a standing ovation, hoisted him on their shoulders and paraded him through the streets. Hours later the police arrested him and charged him with a fine, but they released him after crowds of angry fans surrounded the police station. A long court case ensued, finally resulting in Pedrito's conviction in 2007 with a fine of €100,000.

In 2002, after a national referendum, the Portuguese government gave Barrancos a dispensation from the 1928 ban. In 2014, the same exception was granted to Reguengos de Monsaraz, where a festivity featuring the killing of bulls took place every year despite the ban; the annual event was then recognised as a tradition by a Beja Court, which guaranteed access to the exception.

In 2009, the northern city of Viana do Castelo prohibited bullfighting in all instances when a municipality's permit was required. This decision was contested in 2012 by a Braga court and bullfighting was permitted again in the municipality.

In June 2018, the Póvoa de Varzim municipality announced a bullfighting ban starting January 1, 2019; pro-bullfighting groups interceded against this prohibition and in September 2019, a court in Porto ruled that the ban was unconstitutional. The city of Póvoa de Varzim has approved the demolition of the Póvoa de Varzim Bullfighting Arena, its municipal bullfighting ring.

In July 2018, animalist party PAN presented a proposal at the Portuguese Parliament to abolish all types of bullfighting in the country. Left-wing party Left Bloc voted in favour of the proposal but criticised its lack of solutions to the foreseen consequences of the abolition. The proposal was however categorically rejected by all other parties, that cited freedom of choice and respect for tradition as arguments against it.

== See also ==
- Lusitano
- Portuguese School of Equestrian Art
- Vaquejada - Brazilian variant

== Sources ==
- Gannon, Martin J.; Pillai, Rajnandini (2010). "The Portuguese Bullfight". Understanding Global Cultures: Metaphorical Journeys Through 29 Nations, Clusters of Nations, Continents, and Diversity. SAGE Publishing. ISBN 978-1412957892 – via Google Books.
