= Diana Bar =

Beach library and gallery in Póvoa de Varzim, Portugal

- Bibliioteca Diana-Bar
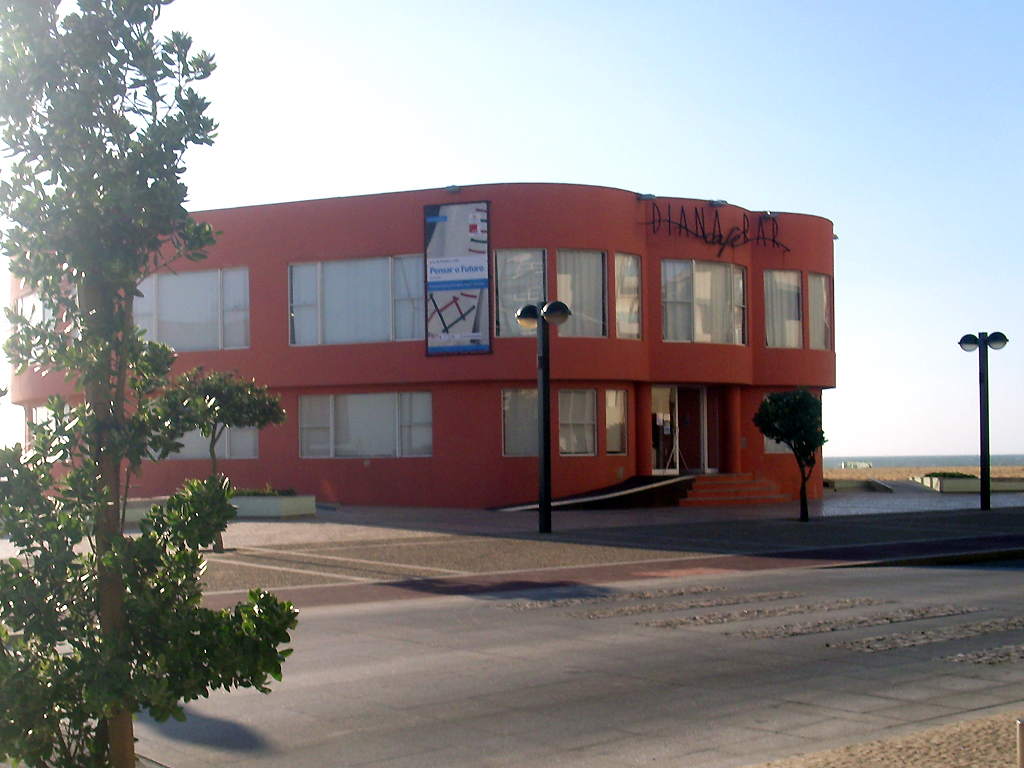
- Diana Bar is a public beach library in a former famous cafe
- 42.640758689821354°N 5.729317138622438°W
- Location: Póvoa de Varzim, Portugal

Other information
- Website: ww.cm-pvarzim.pt/biblioteca/

Diana Bar is a beach library and gallery in Póvoa de Varzim, Portugal. Before being a public library it was a historic café with the same name. It is located in the south end of the city's main waterfront avenue, the Banhos Avenue (Avenida dos Banhos, literally Baths Avenue).

It includes bar and Internet services, and is often used for exhibits and book presentations. The library is very popular, because of its beach view and large windows, in the summer it often gets over 800 visitors per day. The arts TV show, Câmara Clara, of the public broadcaster RTP, was broadcast from there during the 2006 Correntes d'Escritas International literary meeting in Póvoa de Varzim.

A rose colored building, Diana Bar is surrounded by the beach except in the entrance by the Banhos Avenue. It has an egg-shape architectural conception, with large windows and a wide interior. It has an internal balcony around the building that functions as the second floor. Diana Bar's floor mimics the Portuguese pavement, for exteriors, and is a drawing of concentric circles.

== History ==
Diana Bar was built over the beach between 1938/1939, and due to its select nature, it soon became a writers meeting place and for intellectuals coming from various cities. It was where José Régio wrote some of his works, and still today, the table and chair that he often chose are exhibited with his portray. Diana Bar was where José Régio and Agustina Bessa-Luis often met, when she was living in Esposende and he in Vila do Conde. Agustina lived in Póvoa de Varzim earlier in her life, a town that she described as a "magical place in the beginning of my adolescence".

With the death of its founder, the building entered into decay for several years. In November 2001, Póvoa de Varzim City hall bought and restored the building. In the summer of 2002, Diana Bar was ready to reopened as a beach library for the general public, first only in the summer months, but given its popularity it soon started to offer its services all year around.

== See also ==
- List of libraries in Portugal
