= Passeio Alegre =

Coordinates: 41.3793°N 8.7675°W

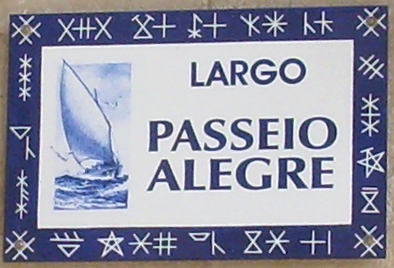
Passeio Alegre square plate

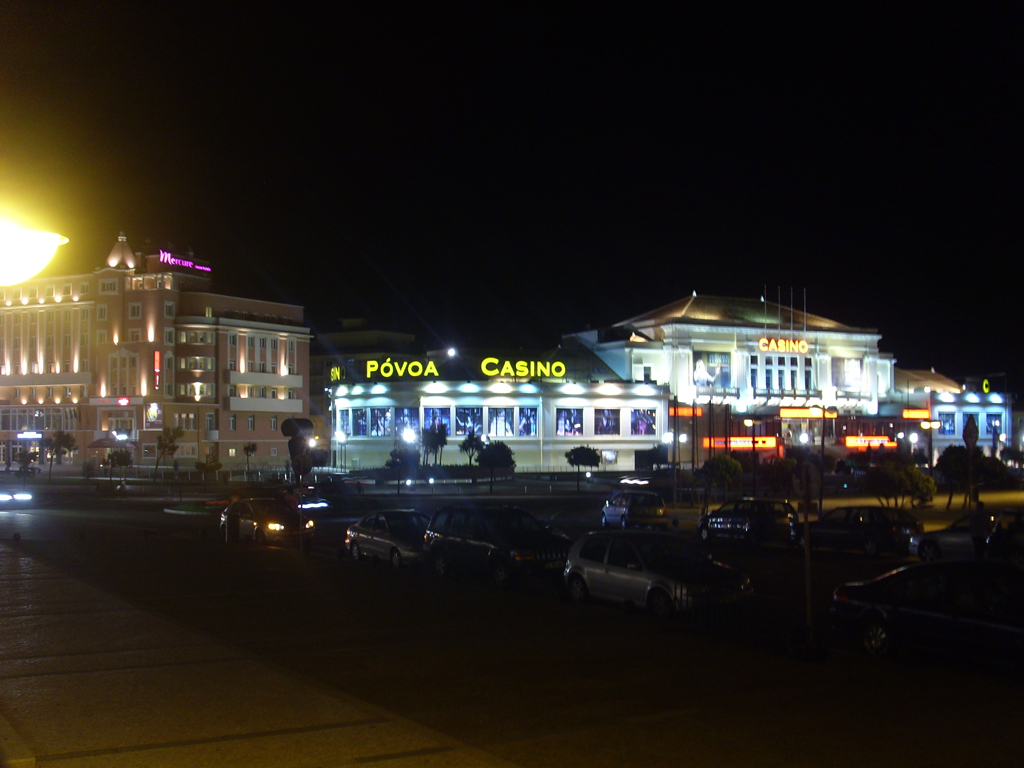
Póvoa Casino and Grande Hotel

Passeio Alegre is a square in Póvoa de Varzim City Center in Portugal, and is listed by IGESPAR as an urban site with public relevance. It is also a beach squared with esplanades and a stage for outdoor performances. Due to the area's popularity in the region, the square is served by two underground parking venues: The one under the extension of Mousinho de Albuquerque Avenue to the north and the one in front of the Casino, to the south. Passeio Alegre can be translated into English as "Glad Stroll".

== Listed heritage ==
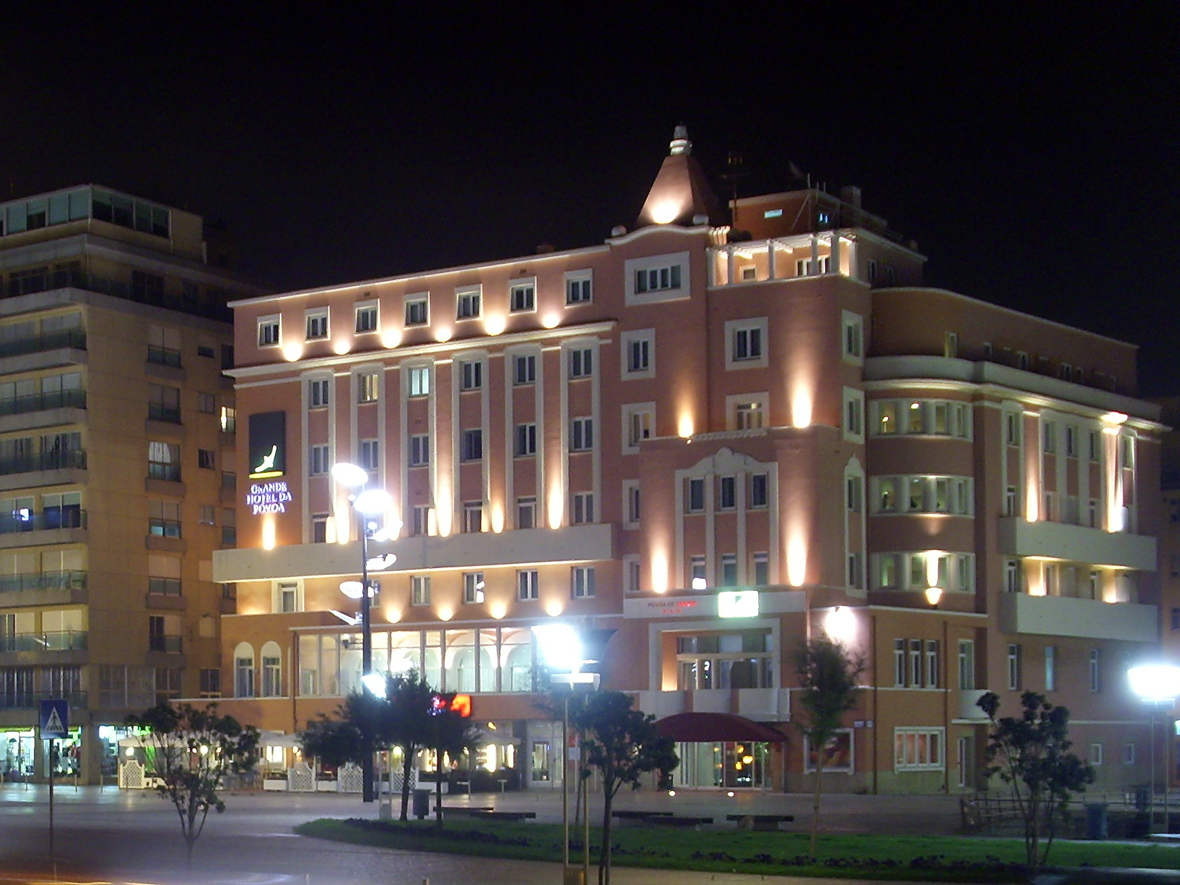
Grande Hotel da Póvoa is an early 1930s modernist building by architect Rogério de Azevedo.

- Passeio Alegre (free space with patrimonial relevance)
- Grande Hotel
- Casino da Póvoa
- Diana Bar
