= Casino da Póvoa =

Casino in Póvoa de Varzim, Portugal

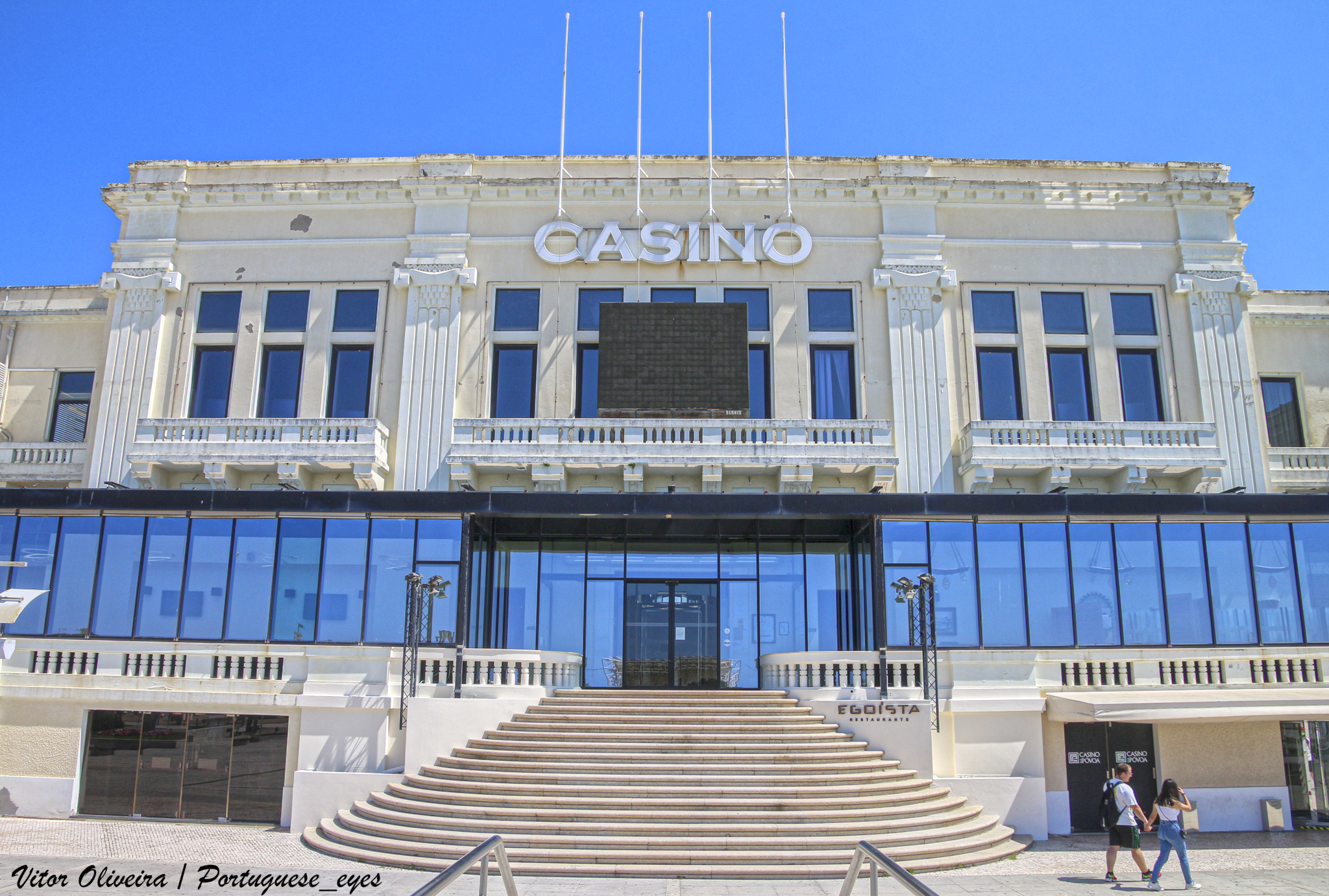
- Casino da Póvoa (2023)
- Interactive map of Casino da Póvoa
- Location: Póvoa de Varzim, Portugal; 41°22′43.21″N 8°45′58.37″W
- Opened: 1930s
- No. of rooms: 3+
- Signature attractions: Bars; Restaurants; Theater; Art gallery
- Notable restaurants: Egoísta Restaurant; Salão d'Ouro
- Operating license holder: Varzim Sol
- Website: casino-povoa.com

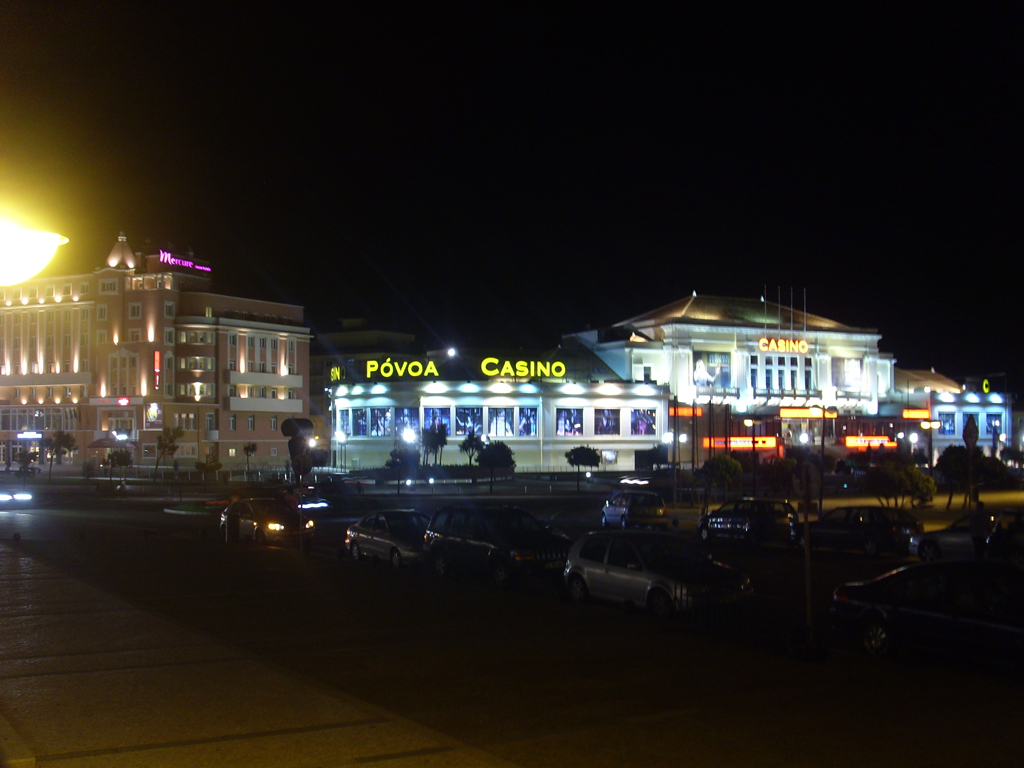
Casino da Póvoa (2023)

Casino da Póvoa (lit. 'Póvoa Casino') is a casino located in Póvoa de Varzim in Portugal. It is a gaming and entertainment venue since the early 1930s. Its building is designed in a Garnier-inspired modernist style and, since 1977, it is listed by IGESPAR, the Portuguese Institute of National Monuments.

The table games most popular with gamblers are Banca Francesa, Roulette, Blackjack and Baccarat.

The casino has several bars, including a live performances bar, restaurants and a theater. Egoísta Restaurant in the Casino offers haute cuisine of local and Portuguese cuisine presented in a gourmet version, the restaurant is surrounded by an art gallery, exhibiting paintings from some of the finest Portuguese artists such as Graça Morais, Júlio Resende, Nikias Skapinakis or Rogério Ribeiro. It is also a patron of Arts with an art prize for Portuguese artists and a notable literature prize for the Portuguese and Spanish-speaking writers from the Iberian Peninsula, Latin America and Portuguese-speaking Africa.

== Sections ==
- Traditional Games Room (1 Punto banco Baccarat, 4 roulette, 2 Black Jack)
- Slot Machines Room (601 slot machines, 8 roulette, Banca Francesa (Portuguese dice Game), 4 Black Jacks, 2 Punto banco Baccarat)
- Sala Mista (Mixed Room, 89 slot machines)
- Bar City (in the Slot Machines Room)
- Bar Garden (in the Slot Machines Room)
- Snack Fair Play (in the Slot Machines Room)
- Bar Chinês (Chinese Bar in sala Mista)
- Bar Atrium (located in sala Mista)
- Salão d'Ouro Restaurant

== History ==
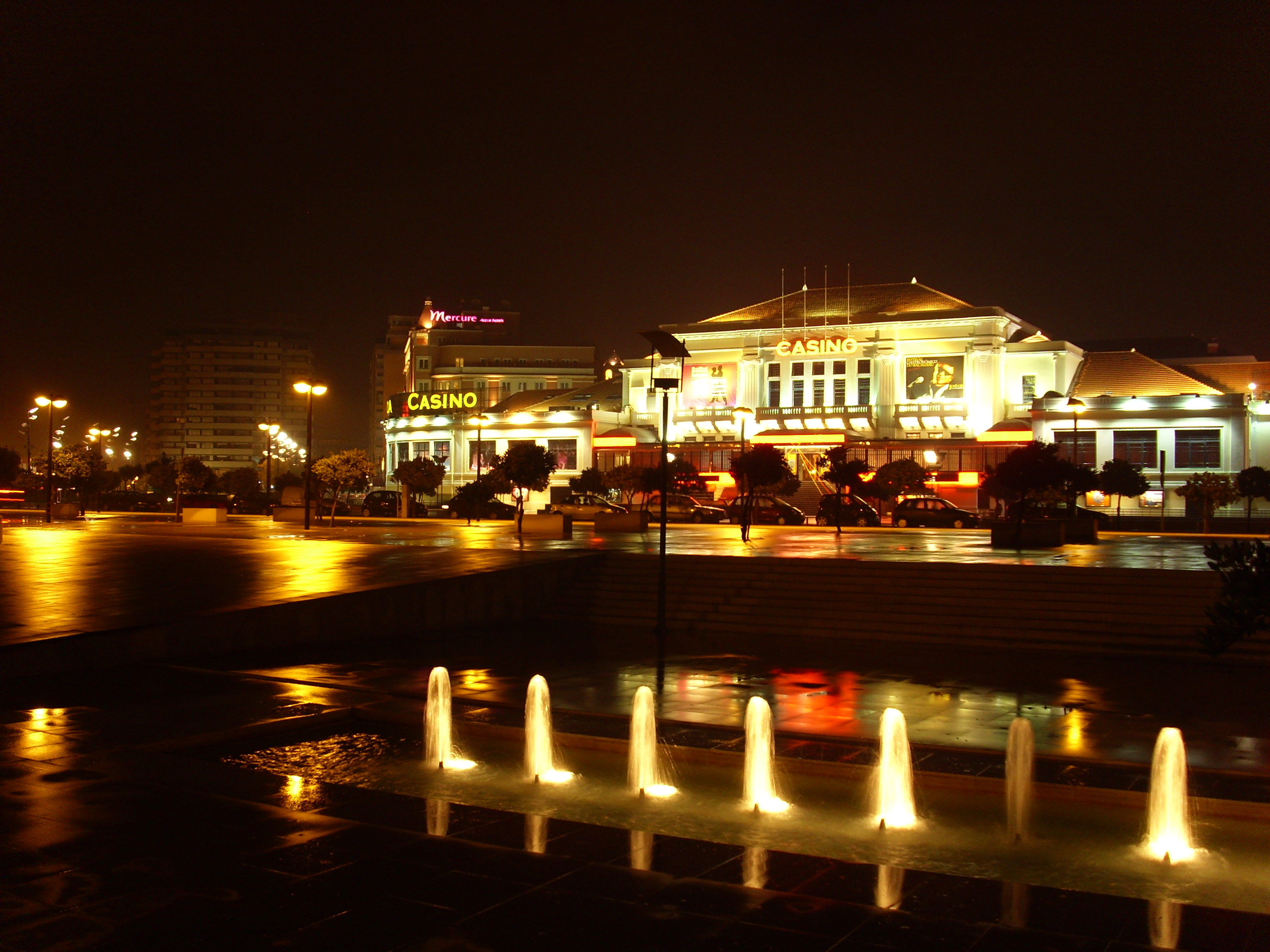
Casino da Póvoa (2007)

Póvoa de Varzim was a Northern Portugal's upper-class beach resort in the 19th century, before the popularization of sea baths and sun baths by the general population, and a prominent site for gambling, with seventeen casinos, frequently in the back-doors of cafés and pubs, the most famous of which was Café Chinês ("Chinese Café"), known in Portugal for its exotic decoration and Spanish dancers. Others were Café Suíço, Café David, Café Universal, and Luso-Brasileiro. Camilo Castelo Branco recurrently visited Póvoa de Varzim to gamble.

The regulation of gambling in the city occurred in early 20th century, and the construction of Póvoa Casino started on February 28, 1930 when an Garnier-inspired modernist building started being built. The casino opened four years later and soon started to be seen as the pro-eminent casino in northern Portugal. The hotel for the casino was built next to it, in Passeio Alegre Square.

Casino da Póvoa is licensed to Varzim Sol since December, 2001. Varzim Sol's major shareholder is Estoril Sol, a company majority-owned by Chinese gambling king Stanley Ho and Amorim group. Prior to Stanley Ho's investments in Póvoa de Varzim, it was licensed to Sopete (Sociedade Poveira de Empreendimentos Turísticos).
