= Póvoa de Varzim City Center =

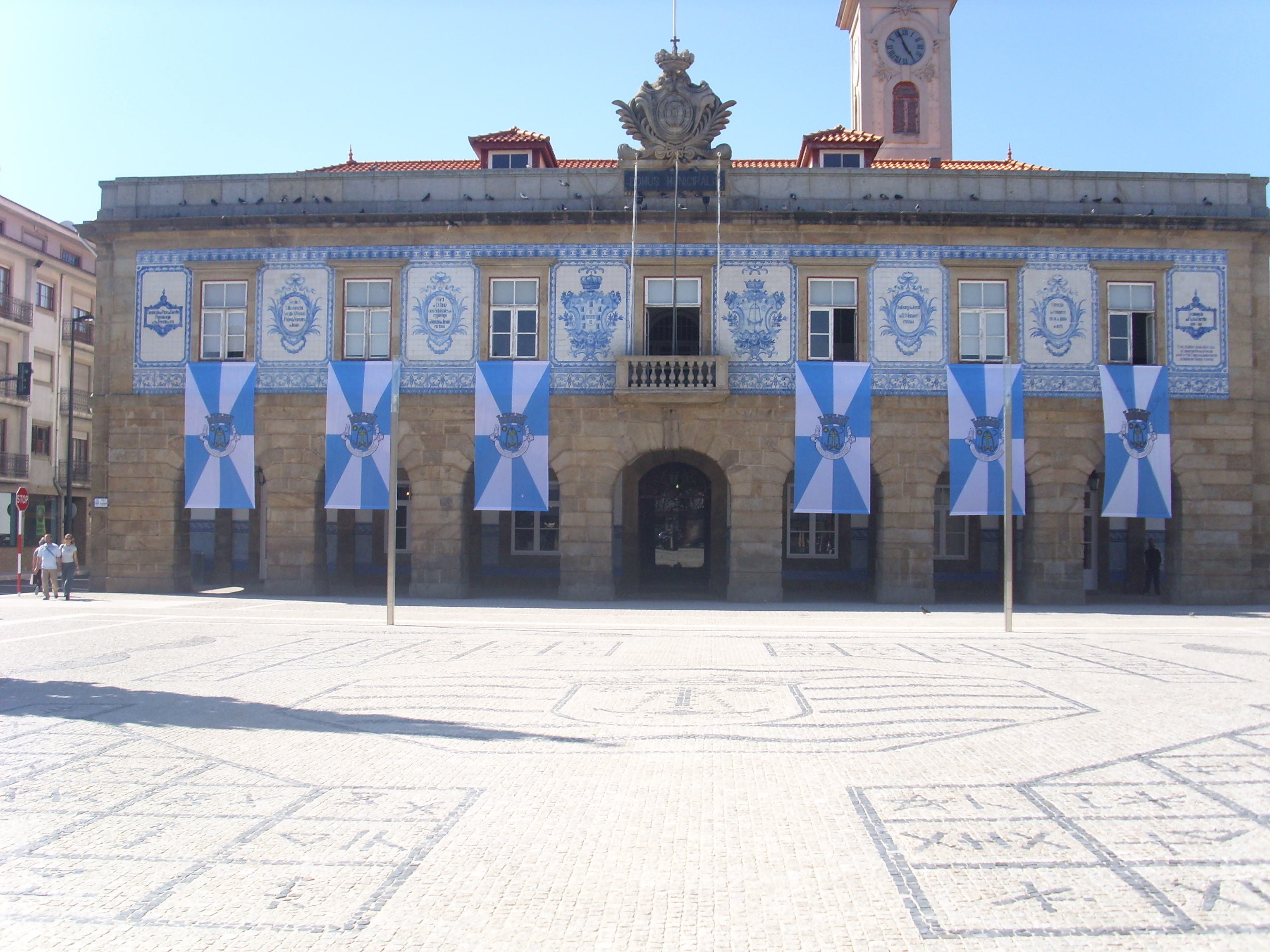
City Hall, in Almada Square, dressed with Póvoa de Varzim municipal flags.

Póvoa de Varzim City Center or Downtown Póvoa de Varzim (Portuguese, Centro) is the heart of Póvoa de Varzim in Portugal, and is the location for most of the city's municipal services, tourist attractions and businesses. It is the center, not only for the city or the municipality, but also neighboring municipalities. The greater downtown area also called "Centro" can also include most districts part of Póvoa de Varzim Parish.

Downtown, as defined by the City Hall, is arranged around Praça do Almada, the civic center, and extends in all directions for a number of blocks, including Junqueira shopping street, Passeio Alegre waterfront square, Mouzinho de Albuquerque business avenue, and Praça Marquês de Pombal (market square). It does not include the medieval and Discovery Age civic center of the city which is located in Bairro da Matriz district.

Despite proven to be occupied at least since the Roman period, Downtown developed its current layout in the 18th century, by royal order of Queen Mary I of Portugal due to the importance that Póvoa de Varzim got as the main seaport in Northern Portugal.

== Urban morphology ==
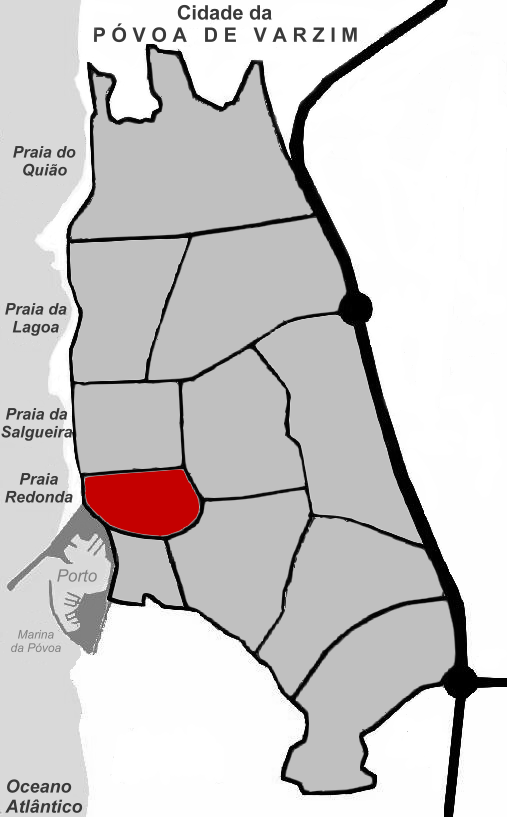
Póvoa de Varzim City Center within Póvoa de Varzim urban area.

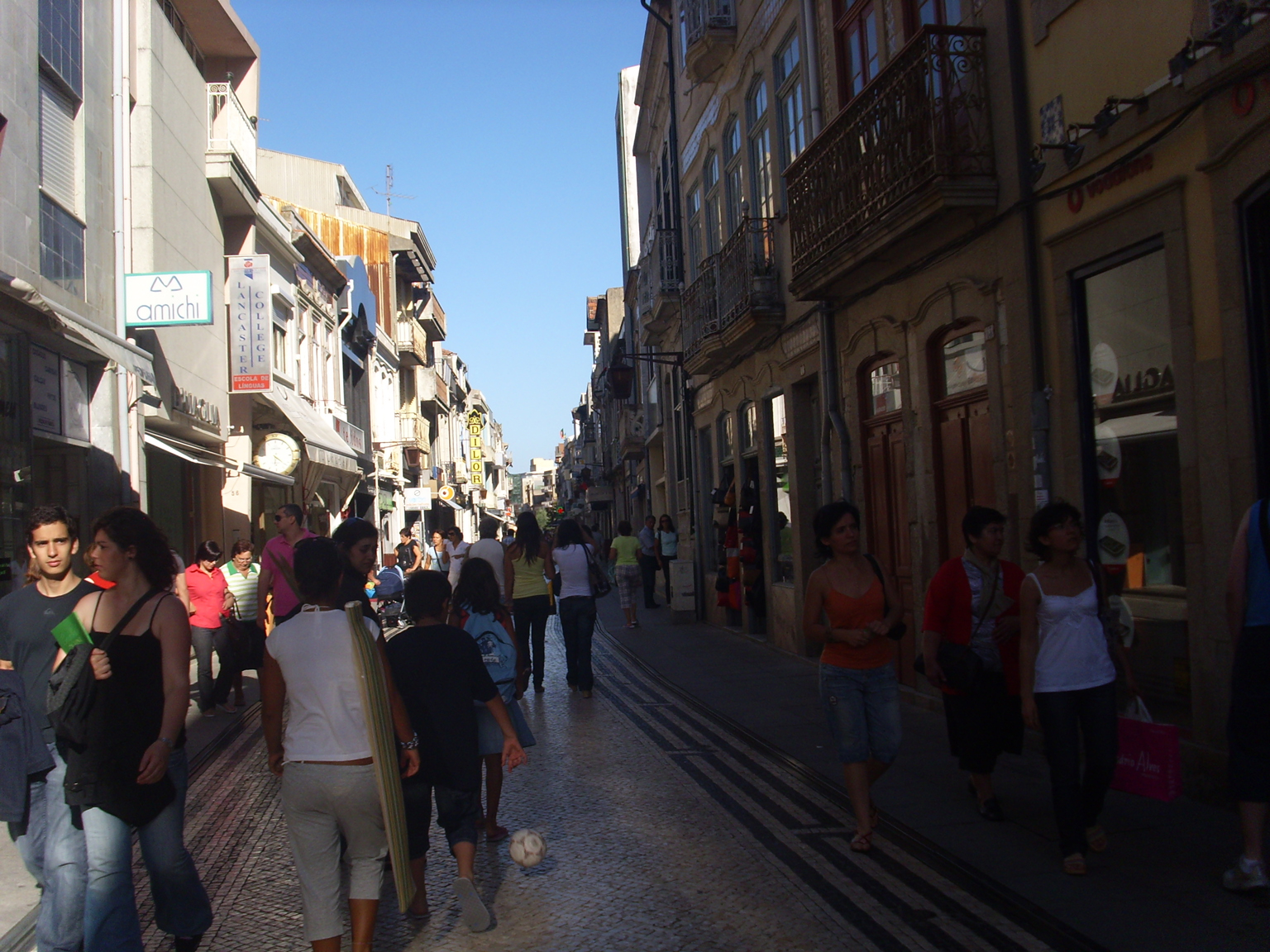
The Rua da Junqueira shopping street.

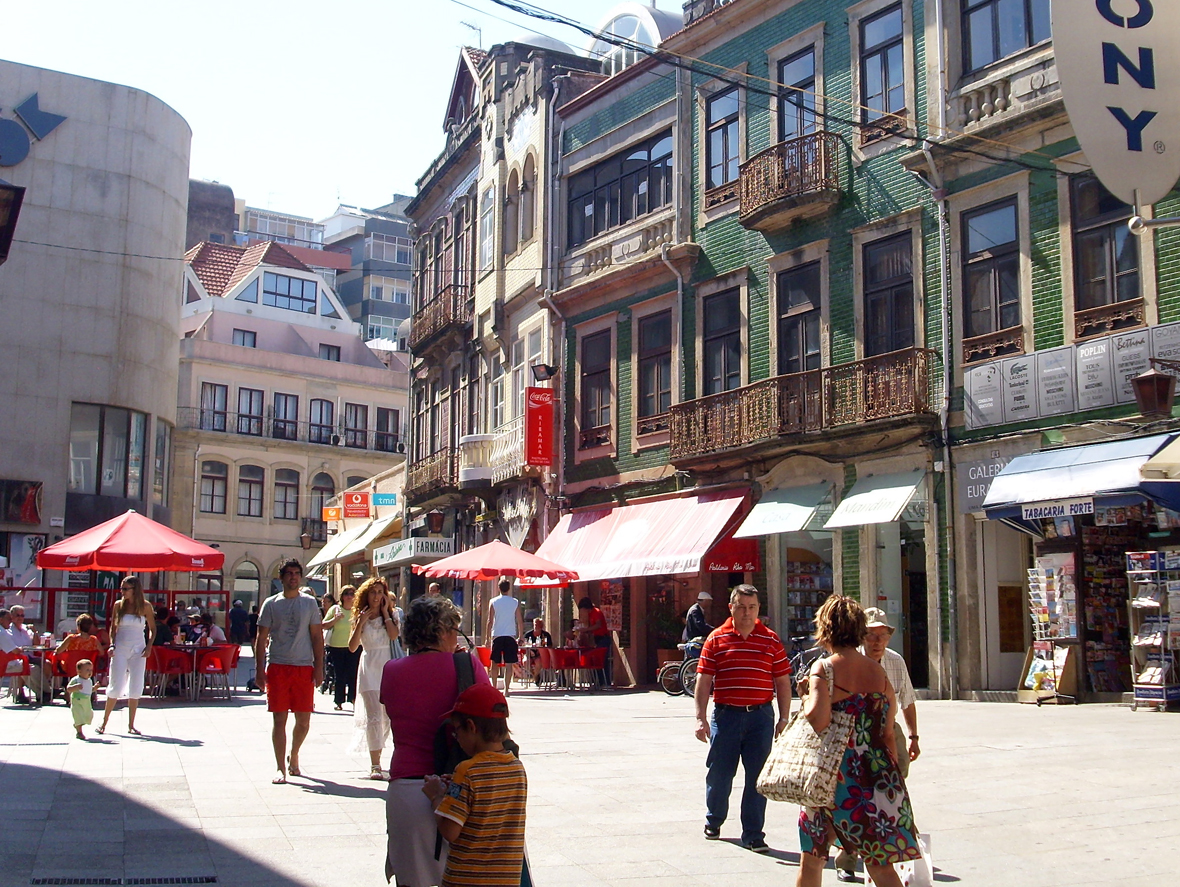
Largo David Alves.

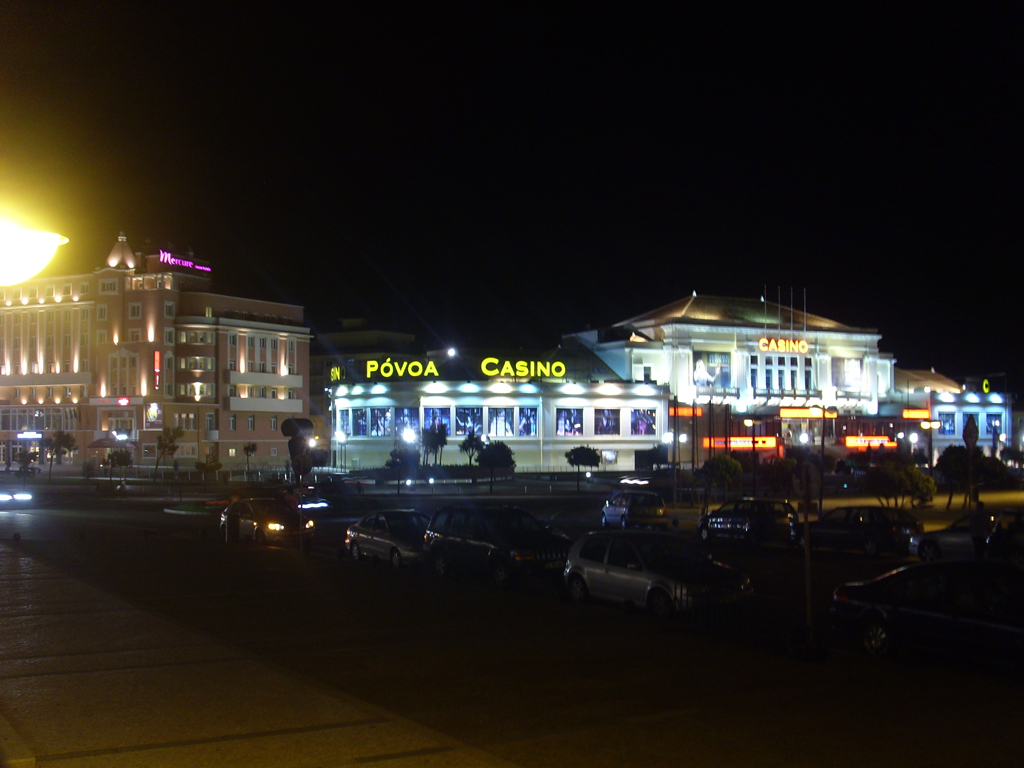
Passeio Alegre beachfront.

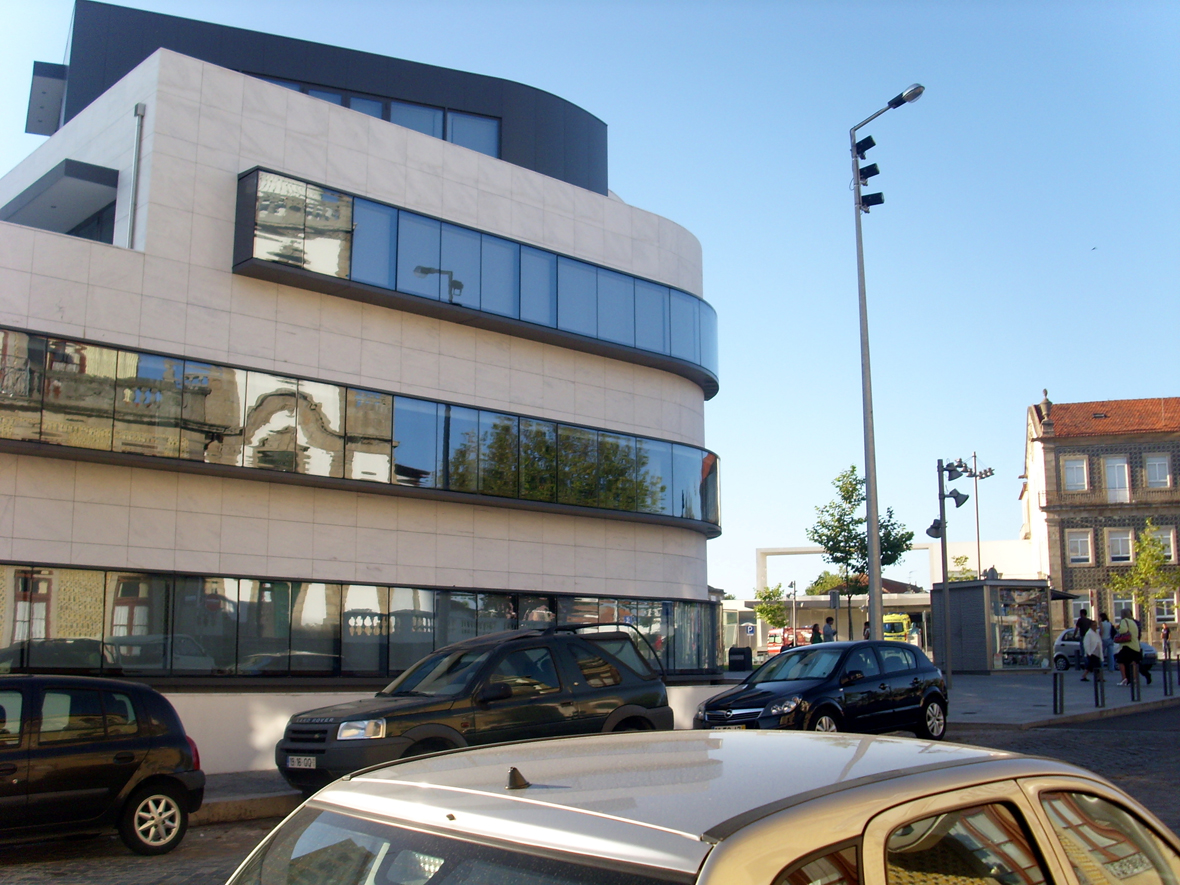
Bank headquarters in Dores Square.

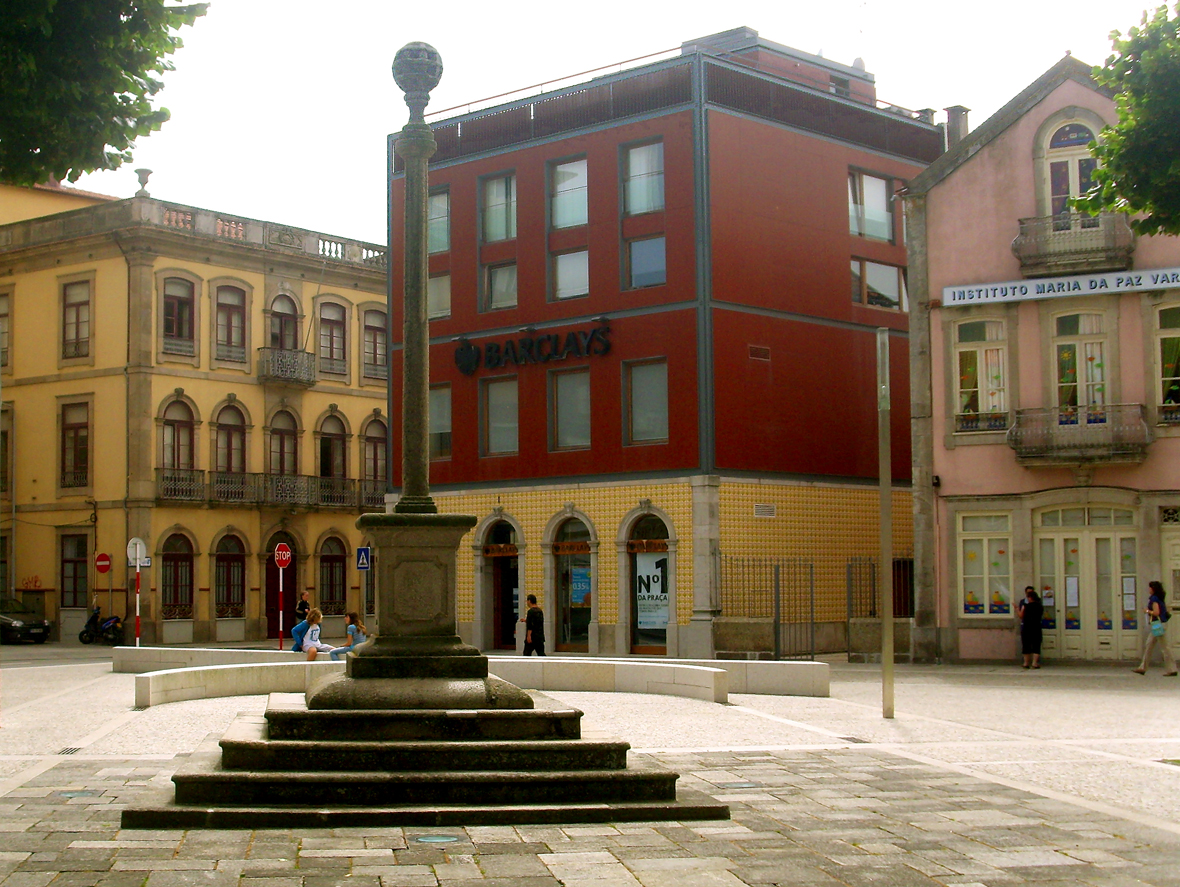
Pillory of Póvoa de Varzim.

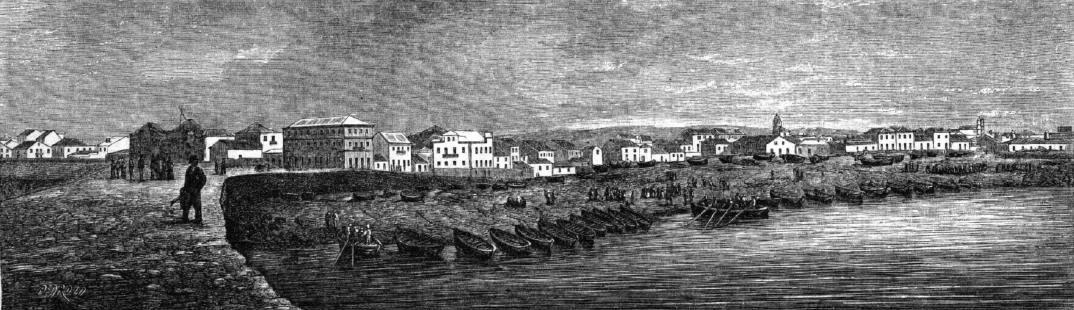
Downtown skyline in the mid-19th century.

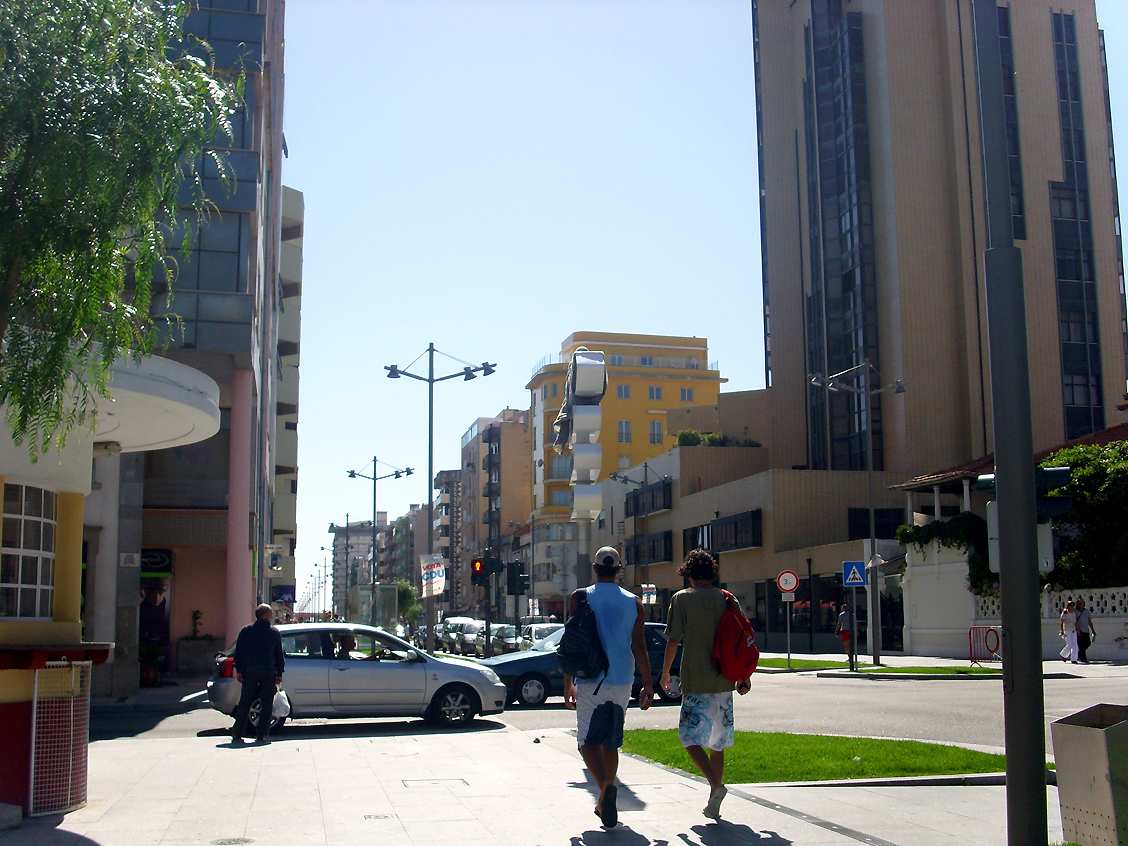
Mouzinho de Albuquerque avenue.

Downtown is limited to the North by Bairro Norte, to the south by Bairro Sul, to the east by Barreiros/Moninhas and Matriz/Mariadeira and to the west it borders Redonda Beach and Póvoa Cove.

Downtown Póvoa de Varzim is, to a large extent, made up of pedestrian areas, with difficult car access in much of its extension, although underground parking spaces are available in the waterfront and in Avenida Mouzinho de Albuquerque.

=== Civic Center ===
Praça do Almada, the civic center, is landscaped in an egg-shape, cut in half by the National Highway 13, and is tipped by buildings with local style. The building of the City Hall (1791) dominates the square. In the square, the Manueline pillory of Póvoa de Varzim (1514) is a national monument and represents Póvoa de Varzim's self-government and laws. Next to the pillory, the romantic gazebo (1904) follows the liking of the old Povoan bourgeoisie for its spare time.

=== Junqueira shopping district ===
Despite being pedestrian, Rua da Junqueira is the most famous and elder of those three streets. Junqueira, which links Praça do Almada to the waterfront, appeared in the written records in 1694, even though artifacts from the Roman era surfaced in diverse street rearrangements and is the site of an ancient Roman fish factory. In 1839, the Town Hall expressed concerns over urbanization issues due to popularity of this street, one of the busiest in Póvoa de Varzim, as it became in that century a full-blown shopping street, identity that it maintained to these days in which ancient stores survive.

Undersized but charismatic squares in Junqueira district, between Praça do Almada and Passeio Alegre (waterfront) can be found: Praça da República and Largo David Alves.

=== Old theater area ===
From the surroundings of Praça do Almada, three parallel streets lead to the waterfront: Rua Tenente Valadim, that ends between the Casino and Grande Hotel, Rua da Junqueira and Rua Santos Minho. The later is related to the arts, most notably performing arts, since the 18th century. It was a square known as Campo das Cobras and the location of a theater since 1793, the local bullfighting arena and circus. The old building Salão Teatro (Theater Saloon) and Teatro Garrett Theater from the 19th century, with small artist's studios in the way, can still be found.

== History ==
Albeit inhabited since the Roman period, with Roman fish factories and a Roman villa. The seaport, a natural harbor, appeared in the written records in the 11th century, and the ship-making industry developed considerably in the 17th century, it was in the 18th century, with the fishing industry getting national importance, that defined the city center as it is today, with the Royal Provision by Queen Mary I on February 21, 1791. The queen ordered Corregedor Almada to reorganize the town's layout given Póvoa's prosperity and importance in the fishing sector. Prior to development the area had lagoons in the port area such as Boído Lagoon and Galé Lagoon.

The new civic center (Praça Nova - New Square) with a new town hall was built in an area used as a market square during some periods in the site of Boído Lagoon. The square was later renamed Praça do Almada in honor of Corregedor Almada efforts. The new square replaced the old town hall around Praça Velha, the Old civic center.

Prior to that, Junqueira district was already a bustling fishing quarter. As the 19th century moved in, and beach therapy became popular with the elites, Junqueira became a bourgeois shopping street.

In the late 19th century and under the visions of David Alves, when Póvoa de Varzim was already a prosperous beach resort, sections of the urbanized area, which didn't grow in an orderly way, were demolished to give way for Mousinho de Albuquerque Avenue, linking Passeio Alegre Square to uptown's Dores Square (Largo das Dores), where mansions for the wealthy beach goers started being built. During the late 20th century, some of the mansions and Orfeão Poveiro music hall ruins were destroyed to give rise to multifamily homes. Despite its losses, Mousinho Avenue got a new character, it became a central business avenue and a rehabilitation program was done in the 21st century.

Around Rego Square, later David Alves square, appeared some of the most charismatic entertainment venues of Póvoa in the 19th century, the Hotel Luso-Brazileiro, the Chinês Saloon, Garrett Theater, among others. Centering the plaza, the Chinês Saloon appeared in 1882 and became popular all over the country and the most famous casino of Póvoa alongside Café David. The elites could listen to music, see shows with Spanish dancers, meet in tertulia and play roulette.

Old bourgeois area par excellence, with the increasing business importance of Junqueira and Praça do Almada, whose spaces had been taken for tertiary activities such as shops and offices, in such a way that, today, only few people live in the most central areas of the city.
