= Garrett Theatre =

Teatro Garrett
- Cine-Teatro Garrett, Cinema Garrett
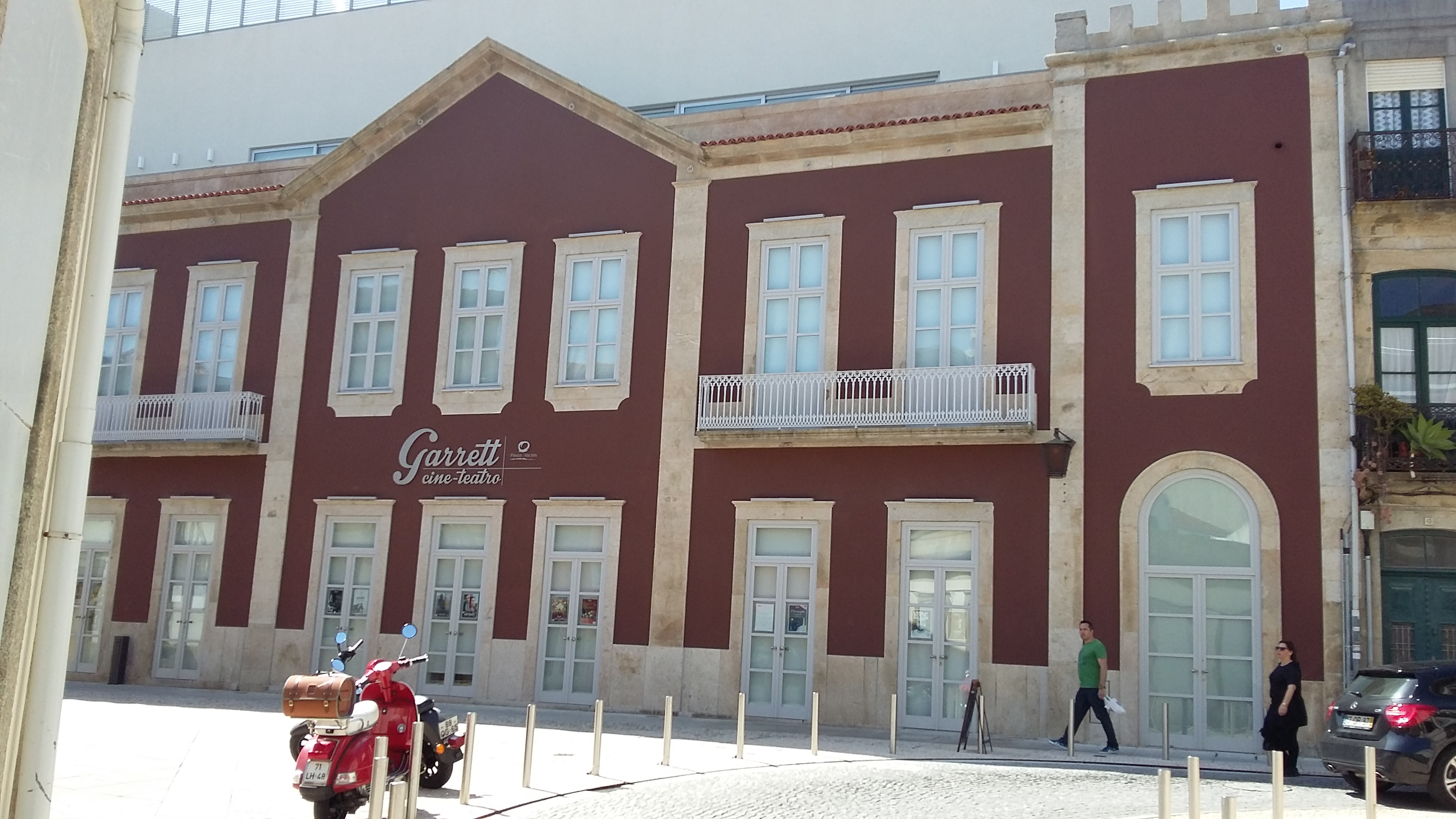
- Interactive map of Teatro Garrett
- Address: Rua José Malgueira, 13; Póvoa de Varzim; Portugal
- Coordinates: 41.3799°N 8.7655°W
- Owner: Póvoa de Varzim City Hall (since 2000)

Construction
- Opened: August 22, 1873
- Closed: 2005–2014
- Rebuilt: 1890, 2009–2014
- Years active: over 100

The Garrett Theatre (Portuguese: Teatro Garrett or Cine-Teatro Garrett, archaic and original Portuguese naming Theatro Garrett) is a theatre located at Rua José Malgueira Street (former rua da Senra street) in Junqueira quarter, Póvoa de Varzim, Portugal which is often referred simply as Garrett. It is one of the historic theatres of Portugal, and some of the best performers of Portuguese, Brazilian and Spanish drama staged there, including Ary Fontoura, João Villaret, Laura Alves, Procópio Ferreira, and Ruy de Carvalho. Orchestras, tunas, variety shows, political meetings were also common in Garrett history.

The theatre is named in honor of famed 19th-century Portuguese playwright Almeida Garrett, who got inspiration to write his most famous work Frei Luís de Sousa after watching a play in Póvoa around this location. The current location is from 1890 and was, by far, the theater with most longevity and social impact in the city and its vicinity. In the middle of the 20th century, with the popularization of cinema, it became known as Cine-Teatro Garrett or Cinema Garrett.

== History ==
=== Origins ===
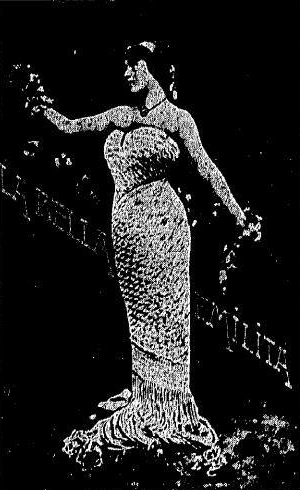
August 1913 Poster from a Companhia de Variedades artist, from Águia d'Ouro, Porto. During that month, Garrett also staged shows from the Lisbon companies Theatro d`Avenida and Grande Guignol, and foreign artists.

The earliest known theatre in Póvoa de Varzim was built in 1793 in Campo das Cobras, location of all early theaters of Póvoa de Varzim. Theater in Póvoa was already common entertainment for beach-goers in the summers of early 19th century. Almeida Garrett most famous work Frei Luís de Sousa was based in one of those plays he watched in Póvoa. Almeida Garrett was also a personal friend of Povoan Francisco Gomes de Amorim. Early Teatro Garrett (Garrett Theater) was an initiative from a society of five citizens from the city of Porto, who built an elegant woodwork building on August 22, 1873, in Praça do Almada. In September 4, 1876, Teatro Sá da Bandeira was built, also using wood-frame construction. This venue was located in the intersection between rua do Norte (currently Rua da Alegria) and Largo do Rego (currently Largo David Alves). The popularity of Póvoa de Varzim as a main beach resort, lead to the construction of a permanent edifice for the theatre in 1890, the Theatro Garrett, in an area near the old Sá da Bandeira Theater, which would be the reason for the demolition of the later. All the great and famed Portuguese actors and world fame artists that staged in Póvoa de Varzim transitioned to Theatro Garrett.

It was a fundamental venue for the Povoan society at the time, with impact felt also in Northern Portugal, that came to Póvoa for sea-baths, and several people watched plays, cinema and concerts in there, for the first time in their lives. Several good-will actions were organized in there.

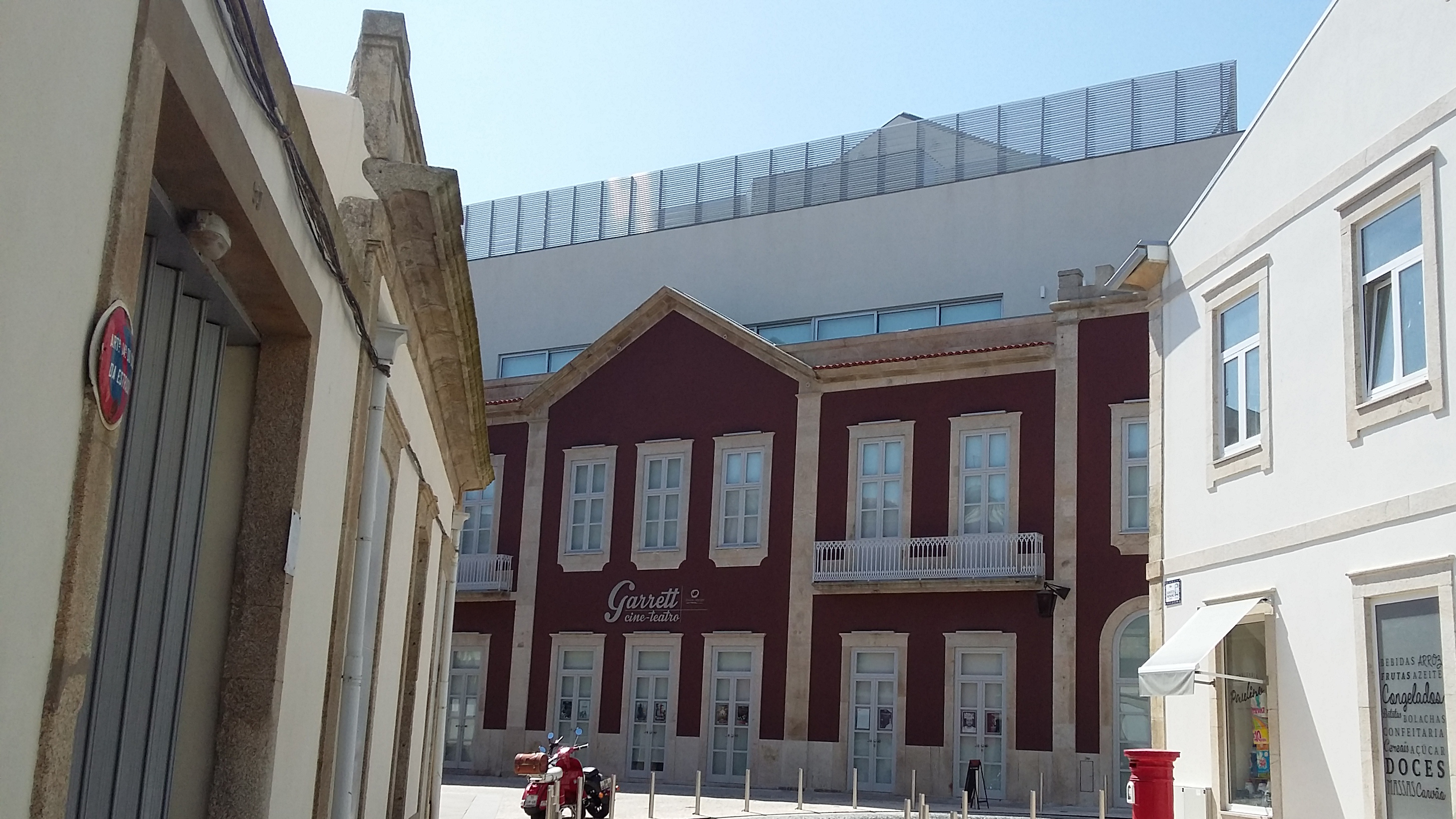
Garrett Theatre as seen from Santos Minho street.

In the early years of the 20th century, Póvoa was the preferential route for the great national and international artists, especially Spanish. it was in Póvoa that the stars of the period initiated their tour in Portugal. It was, in Northern Portugal, the location with more show venues, especially coffee houses with musical entertainment, the café-concerto. Each coffee house brought to Póvoa the best in music, drama, and dance. Garrett Theater was the great theater of this period. The national press highlighted the operetta companies, revue theatrical entertainment and zarzuela that were presented in Garrett. Some of these companies included the Sociedade Artística de Lucinda Simões, Lisbon's Teatro do Ginásio and Porto's Teatro Nacional presented in there quality plays, and some premiered in there.
