= Districts of Póvoa de Varzim =

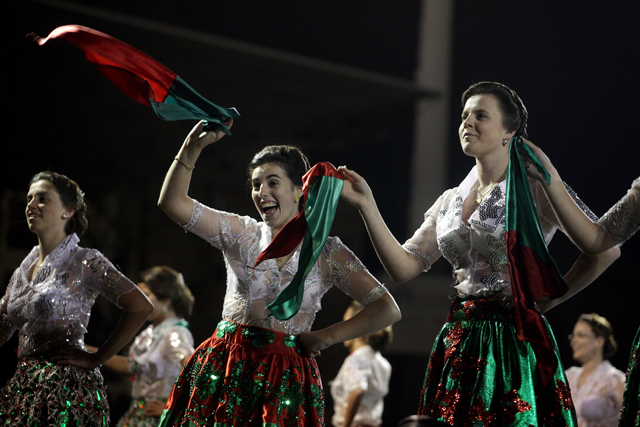
Tricana girls from Bairro de Regufe presenting to the audience their quarter colors, red and green.

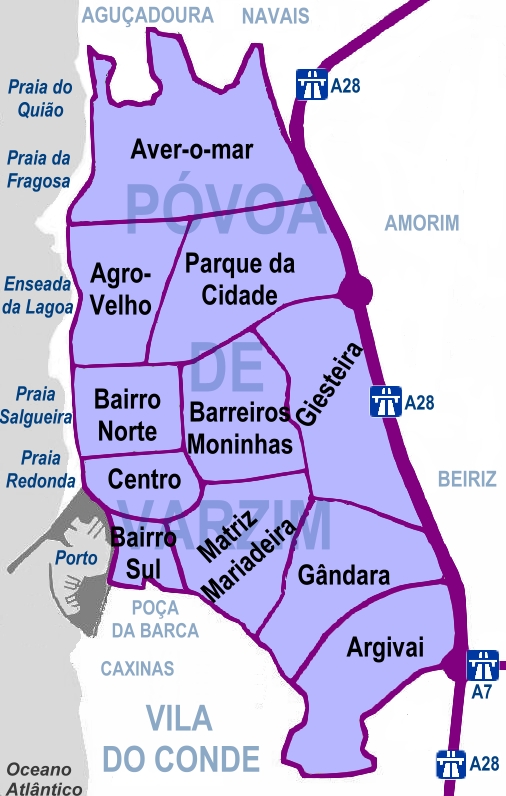
The city of Póvoa de Varzim is located in a total area of 12.8 km^{2} and is divided in eleven districts.

The urban area of Póvoa de Varzim in northern Portugal is divided into eleven districts (partes, lit. "parts"), each with distinctive zones (zonas), which are significant areas of the city and have population and topological differences. The vernacular terminology and 19th century subdivisions for the town is Bairro (neighbourhood or quarter).

While most of the assigned boundaries match with traditional local designations, some others differ from common traditional use, for instance the northern area of Giesteira is understood as part of Barreiros. This is a result of the City Planning Commission's wish to divide the city with a population of about 3 to 4 thousand in each district. Although, the idea of a neighbourhood equal to a district was aimed, sometimes it was not possible, given the fact that some are excessively small. While most of the districts have been in common use by locals for generations, some designated names are rarely heard outside of the Planning Commission usage, such as "Parque da Cidade" or "Agro-Velho". Some districts are formed by more than one quarter, such as the Matriz/Mariadeira formed by Matriz, Mariadeira, Regufe, Penalves, and Coelheiro or the Barreiros/Moninhas District formed by Barreiros and Moninhas.

== City districts ==
- A Ver-o-Mar: Santo André, Aldeia Nova, Boucinha, Caramuja, Fontes Novas, Fragosa, Mourincheira, Paço, Paranho, Paranho de Areia, Palmeiro, Perlinha, Finisterra, Paralheira, Refojos.
- Agro-Velho: Agro-Velho, Nova Póvoa, Carota
- Bairro Norte: Salgueira, Desterro, Carvalhido, Vila Velha (old town)
- Centro: Junqueira, Praça do Almada, Av. Mouzinho de Albuquerque, Ribeira, Castelo
- Bairro Sul: Lapa, Bairro dos Pescadores, Póvoa 7
- Parque da Cidade: Montgeron, Sencadas, Sesins
- Barreiros/Moninhas: Barreiros, Moninhas, Portela
- Matriz/Mariadeira: Matriz (Cidral), Mariadeira, Regufe, Penalves, Nova Sintra, Coelheiro, Mourões
- Giesteira: Belém, Giesteira de Cima, Arroteias, Barreiros Nascente
- Gândara: Gândara, Penalves Nascente, Calves
- Argivai: Aguieira, Bom Sucesso, Casal do Monte, Cassapos, Igreja, Fiéis de Deus, Oliveira, Padrão, Pedreira, Quintela.

== Traditional quarters ==
Póvoa de Varzim has six relevant cultural quarters (bairro), all of which located in Póvoa de Varzim City Centre: Bairro Norte, Bairro Sul, Bairro da Matriz, Bairro de Belém, and Bairro de Regufe. These have greater importance for the inhabitants during the Rusgas during Póvoa de Varzim Holiday on June 28 and 29.

== Electoral civil parishes ==
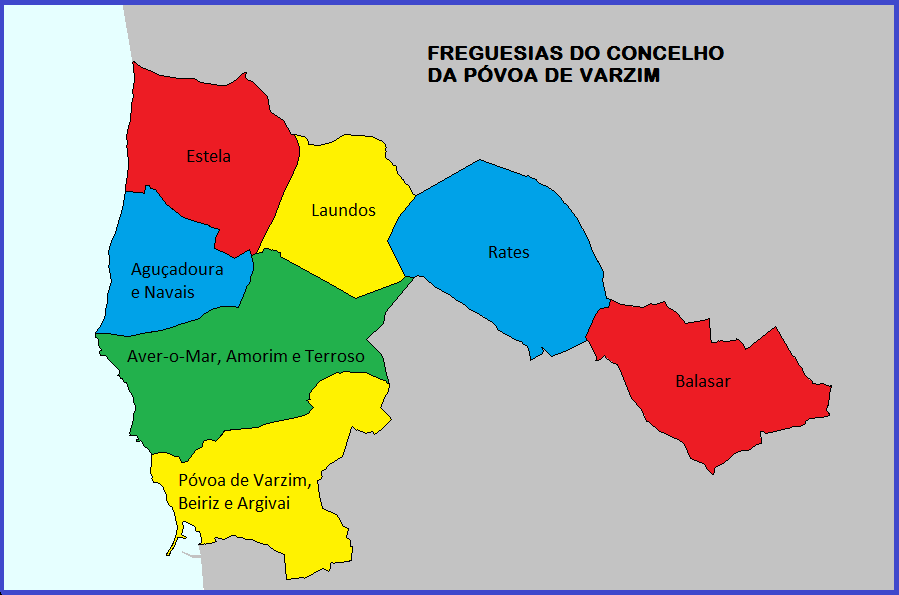
The 7 civil parishes of Póvoa de Varzim are located in a total area of 82.1 km^{2}

Póvoa de Varzim has seven civil parishes (freguesia), which are formal administrative subdivisions of the municipality, including the urban area and the city outskirts. These civil parishes are derived from ecclesiastical parishes located in medieval farmsteads, most of which have records dating to the 11th century.
