= Rua Santos Minho =

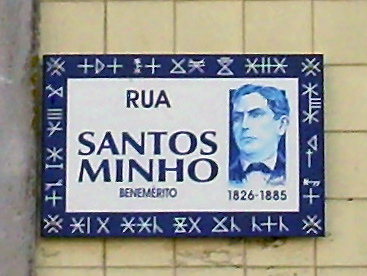
Street plate honoring a 19th-century individual.

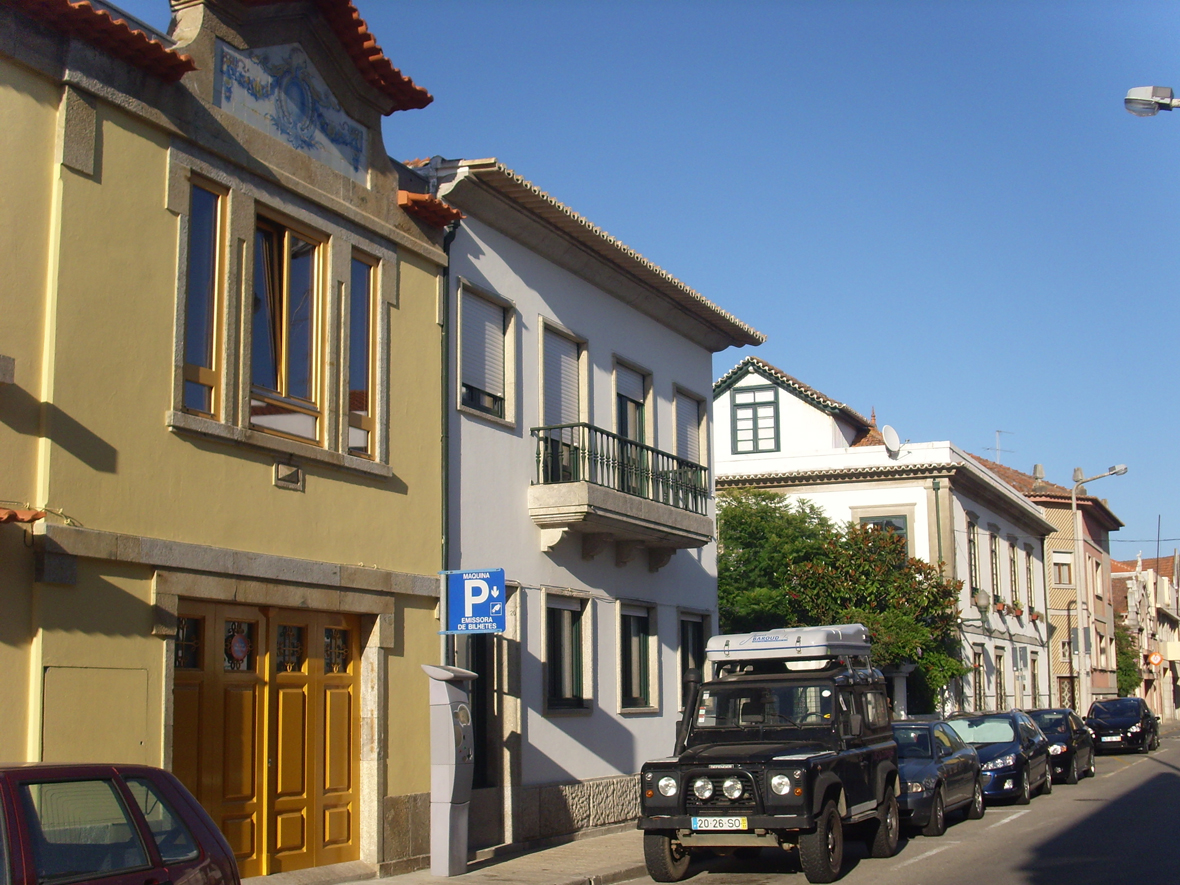
Typical houses in the street.

Rua Santos Minho is a small street in Póvoa de Varzim city center, in Portugal. The area formerly known as Campo das Cobras is the historical site for theater, bullfighting and cinema in Póvoa de Varzim.

== History ==
In Campo das Cobras (Snakes field), quarter between Santos Minho Street (to Hortas street) with Manuel Silva Street, was the site where the wooden bullrings and circus were built. This was the site where in 1904, the Aula Alexandre Herculano was built, currently the school is known as Escola dos Sininhos.

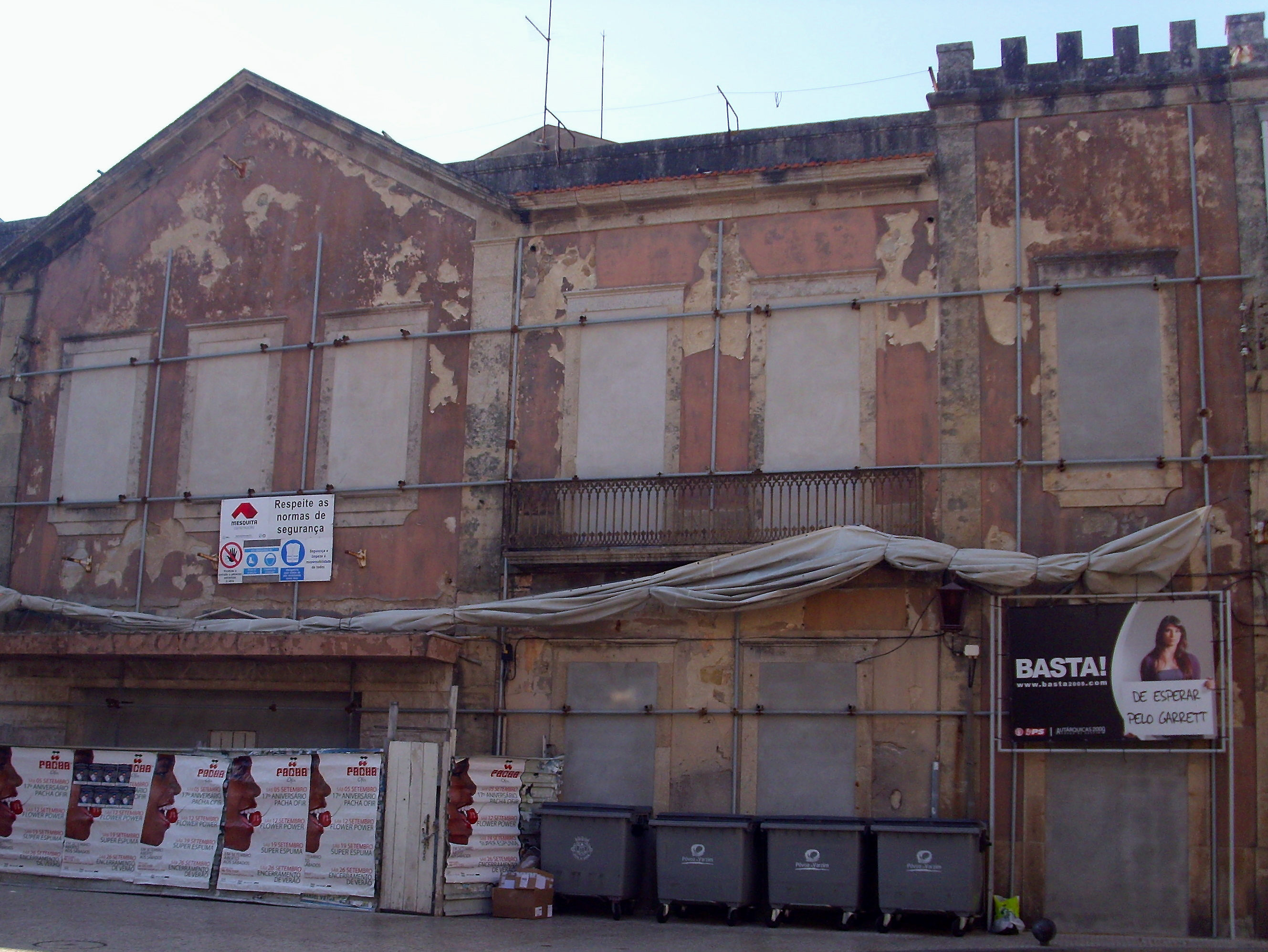
The decaying facade of Garrett Theatre and protest poster in 2009.

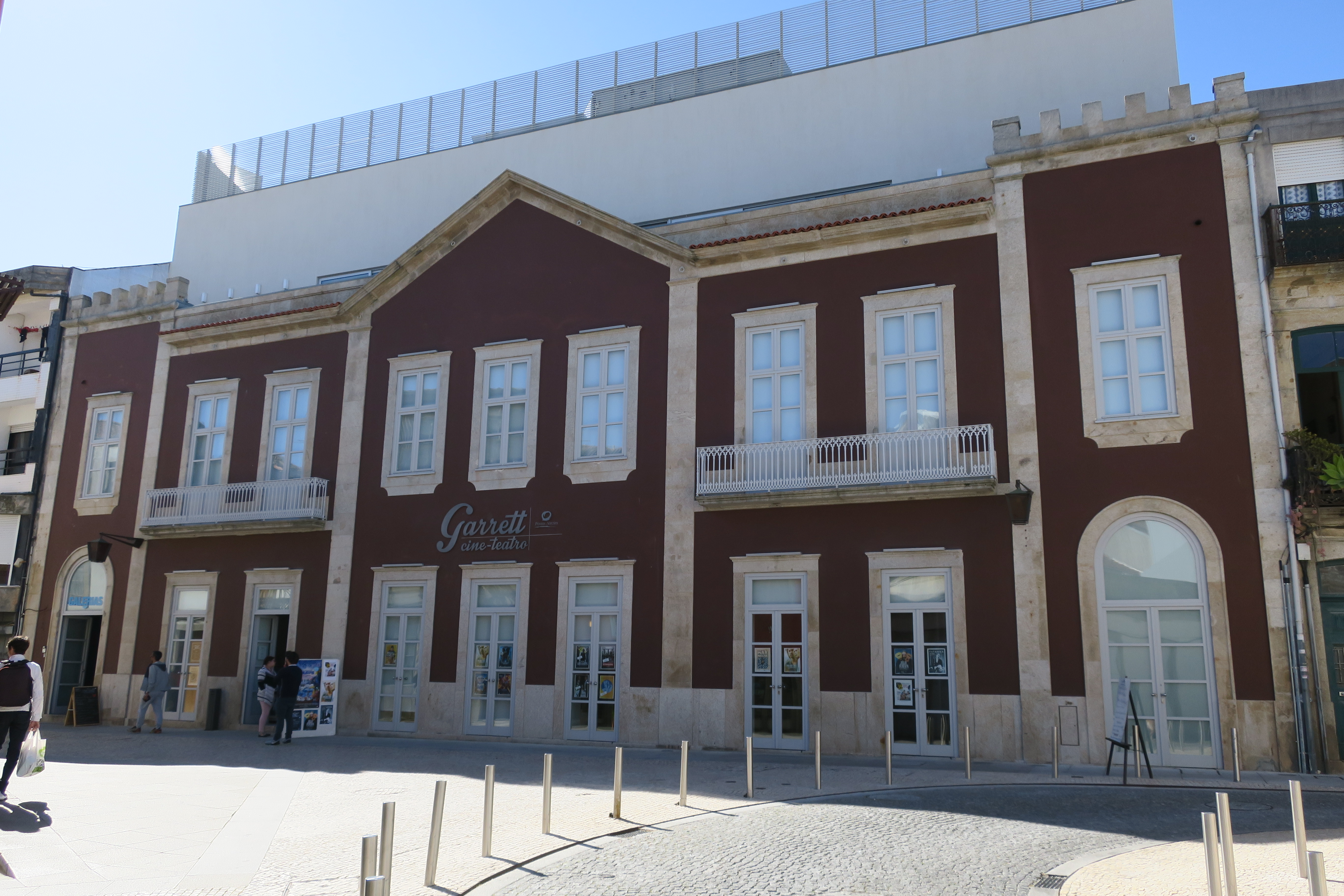
Façade of Garrett Theatre in 2017.

The theatrical tradition in Póvoa de Varzim can be traced to 1793, when Póvoa organized important festivities to celebrate the birth of Maria Teresa of Braganza, Princess of Beira, daughter of King John VI, at the time prince regent. To the theatre built at the side of the bullring, came the shire's Corregedor Francisco de Almada e Mendonça to watch an Italian operetta. Of the four days program, from August 24 to 27th, there were two Italian operas, several Portuguese comedies, a small Italian play, and several bullfightings.

As Póvoa was a prosperous beach resort popular amongst the elite of Northern Portugal provinces and Portuguese-Brazilians, Garrett Theatre opened on August 22, 1873 initially in a wooden building, in the quarter between Santos Minho Street and Senra Street, near the gambling venues and the beach. Present-day Santos Minho street was only inaugurated in June 1876 and at the time was known as Rua Freitas Soares. The street had the porpoise to link the city center to the area used by beach-goers.

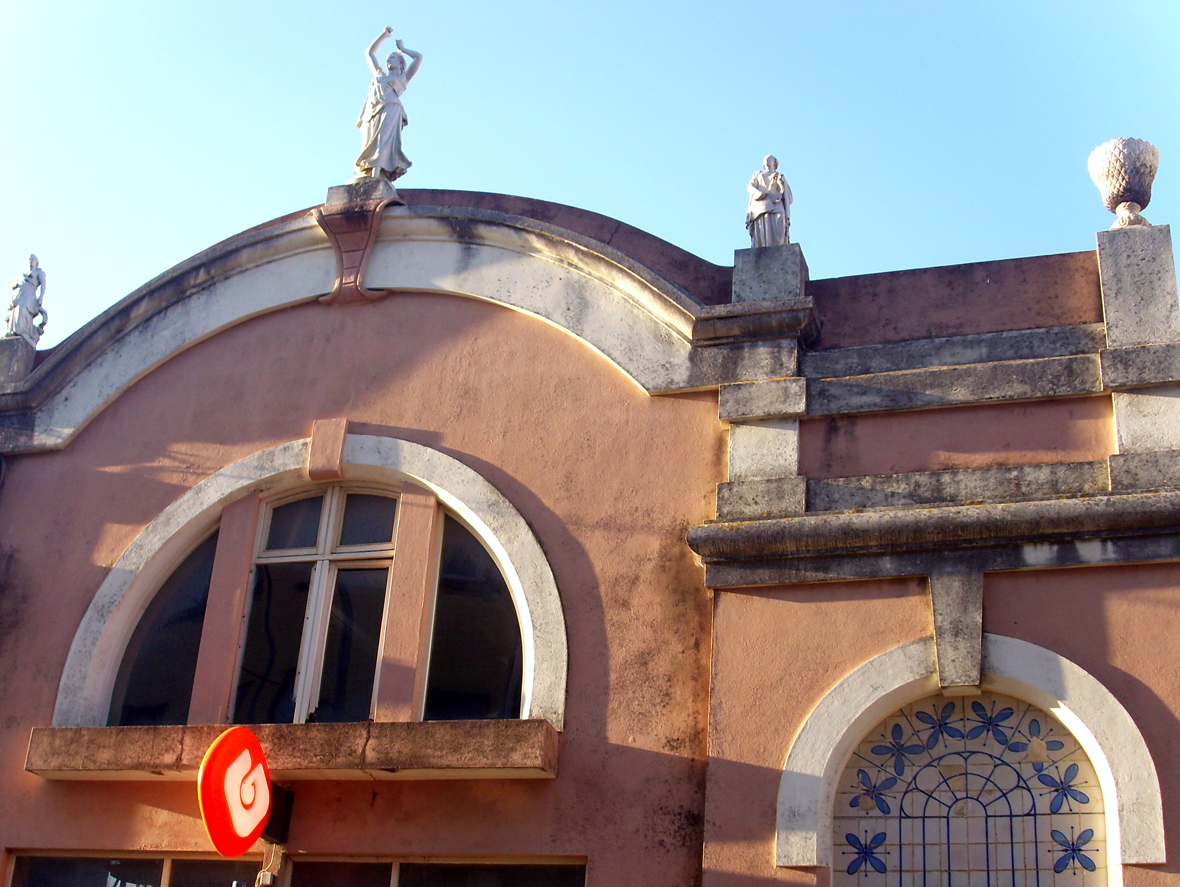
The facade of the Old Salão Teatro.

On September 4, 1876, the new Sá da Bandeira Theatre, also built in wood, opened to the public with the drama "O Cabo Simão", by a Spanish theater company. At Garrett's Theatre side there was the Salão Recreativo Dramático (Drama Recreational Saloon) where the local amateur theatrical company Troupe Dramática Recreativa Povoense staged in the years of 1897 and 1898.

In the early years of the 20th century, Póvoa was preferred by the great national and international artists, especially Spanish. It was in Póvoa that the stars of the age initiated their tour in Portugal. It was the location, in Northern Portugal, where there were more entertainment venues. Each saloon brought to Póvoa the best in music, dramatic arts and dance. Garrett Theater was the great theater of this period.

On the number 10, the site of Campo das Cobras, The 1910 Salão Theatro (Theatre Saloon) was located, this venue was chosen by local associations for recitals, presenting theatrical plays and elite cinema. All of these theaters closed their doors, with the exception of Garrett that kept open, although due to the age of a century-old building and safety problems, it closed in 2005 for rehabilitation with a planned reopening for the 2010-2011 period. It reopened only on June 14, 2014. While Salão Theatro reopened as Theatro in March 2017 as a mixed-space with a restaurant, wine bar, library, and art gallery.
