= Praça da República (Póvoa de Varzim) =

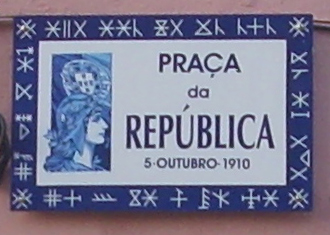
The square's plate honoring the Portuguese Republic.

Praça da República (literally Republic Square), formerly named Largo de São Roque (Saint Roch Square) is a small square in the city of Póvoa de Varzim in Portugal.

The square has about 900 square meters, and is located between Junqueira shopping street and Praça do Almada square, the civic center. It is sometimes popularly known as Largo de Santiago (Saint James Square).

== History ==
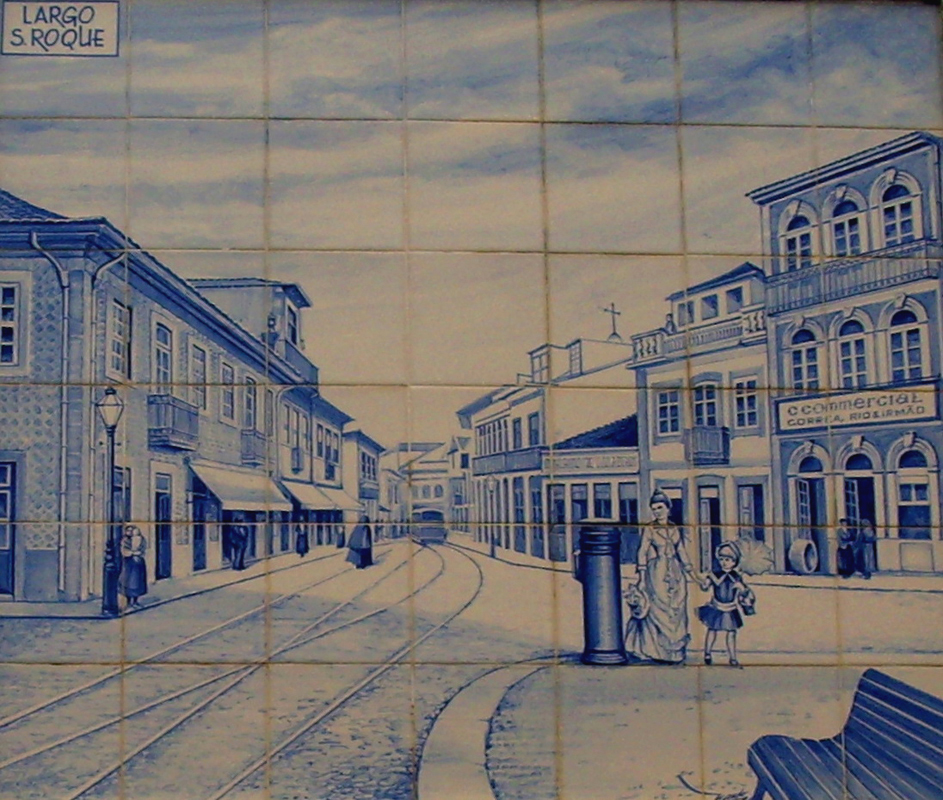
Streetcar tramline.

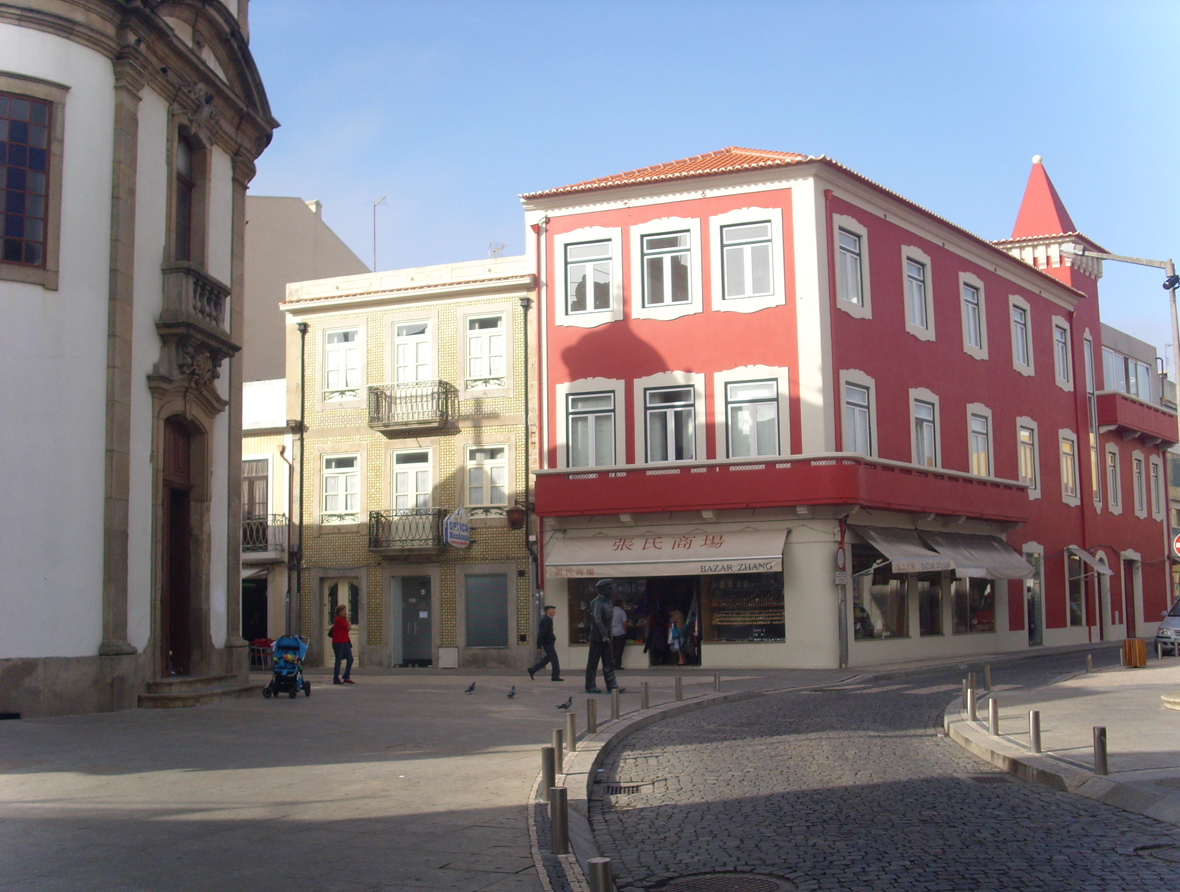
Former hotel.

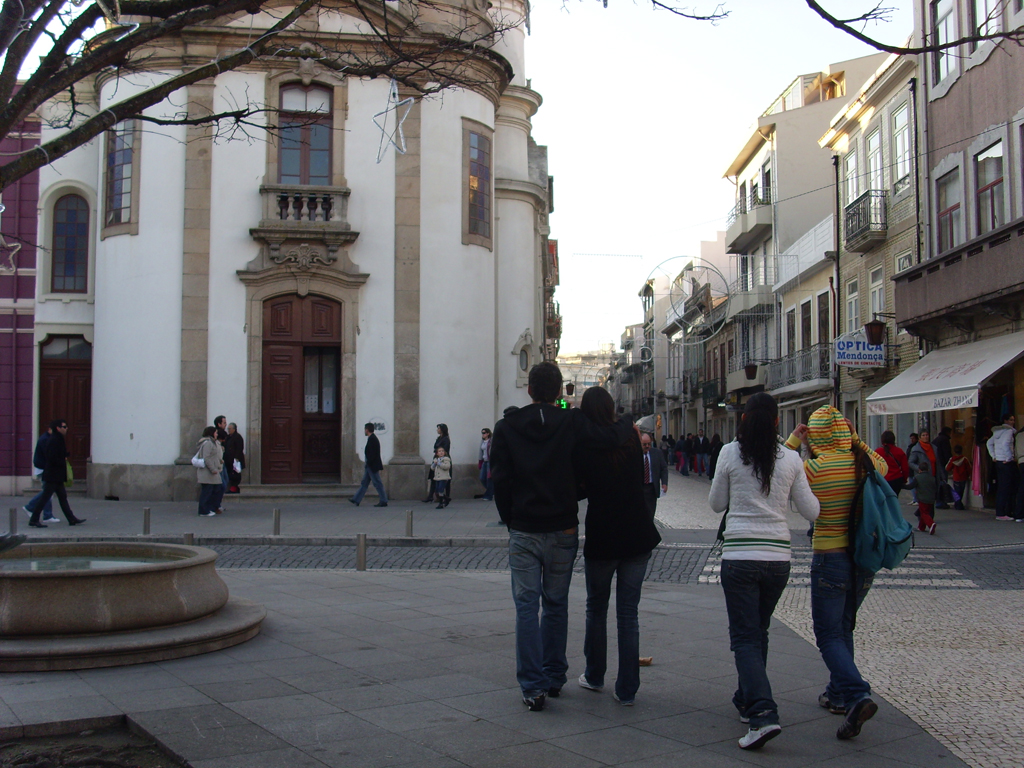
Entrance of Junqueira Street, with São Roque Chapel visible on the left.

Capela de São Roque or Saint Roch Chapel was founded in 1582, by the seafarer Diogo Peres de S.Pedro and his wife Maria Fernandes de Faria. Meanwhile the cult to a Saint James icon (possibly from the 15th century), found at the beach, expanded the Saint James cult, justifying a change in invocation. In 1741 the Confraria de Santiago (Brotherhood of Saint James) was created in there and, by 1887, the chapel was reformed and expanded. the foundation of the temple was due to its location at a crossroads that joined in only one way to reach Ribeira, an area in the Port of Póvoa de Varzim.

In the 1800s, Junqueira street was a busy shopping street and used as a way to reach the beach and gambling saloons, especially the nationwide famous casinos Salão Chinês and Café David. Due to the fact it is a wide area, the square started being used as an entrance for the people of the provinces of Minho, Trás-os-Montes and Alto Douro, that arrived in Póvoa due to medical advice to cure several health problems, in which they plan to cure by diving in rich iodine seawaters, sunbathing and breathing sea-aroma air. By this, the square gained relevance and was where the coachwomen parked the cars. In 1897, when the streetcar tramline was expanded a shunting line is created that goes by the square reaching the Baths Beach.

By then there were lodging needs, and to answer that, hotels were created. In 1893 some hotels are registered in the area such as Aura Campista, in the square's number 12, and in the immediacy Hotel do Sinal and Hotel Universal (1896). In 1908, the Hotel Europa. With the new tourism laws in the early years of the 20th century, all hotels in this area had disappeared.

== Urban morphology ==
Praça da República has a triangular shape. The São Roque Chapel, today mostly known as Santiago Chapel, centers the square to the west. This temple was the origin of the name of the square for most of its history. In front of the church there's the fountain with the scallop shell of Saint James, representing the pilgrim . It is a central stop for pilgrims on the Coastal way of Saint James. However several sites dedicated to Saint James exist in Póvoa de Varzim. Monastery of Rates Romanesque church and other inland Saint James sites in the central way can be reached with a 2 hours-walk crossing Cividade Hill and São Félix Hill. In the coastal route, the pilgrim is the directed throw signs to head to the beach, going throw Rua da Junqueira, Rua da Alegria, reaching Avenida dos Banhos, a promenade along the beach, before reaching the beach-walkways.

The chapel is sided by the old headquarters of Clube Naval Povoense. Clube Naval is the local yacht and water sports club of the city since 1904, it is the oldest local sports club. Nearby the Ritz Café, one of the traditional contemporary coffee-shops of Póvoa de Varzim, opened to the public since 1979.
