= Moninhas =

- Neighborhood of Póvoa de Varzim
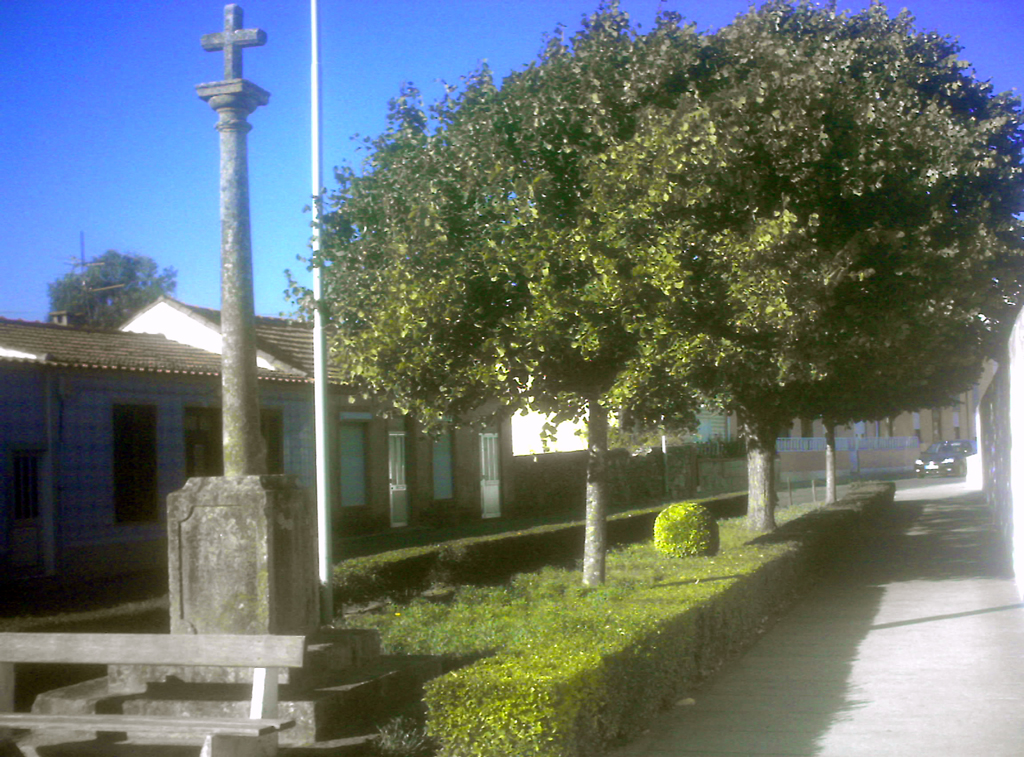
- Cruzeiro of the Cemetery thought to be the origin of the sigla poveira known as Padrão

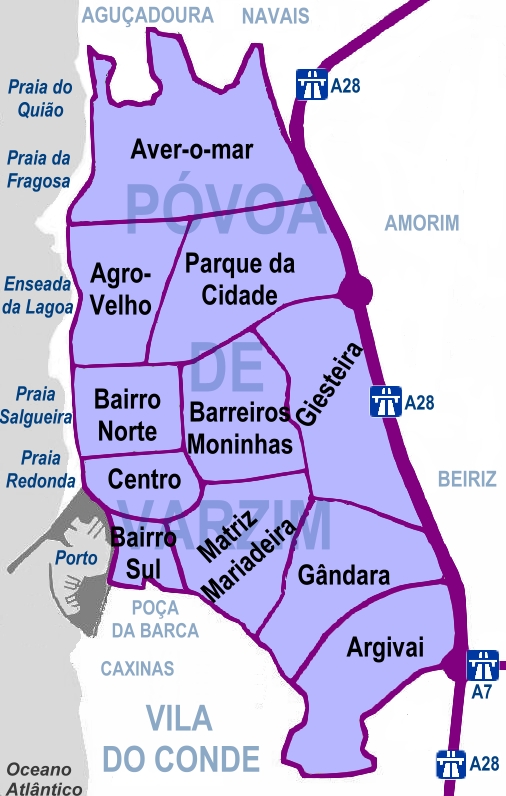
- Map of Póvoa de Varzim, with Moninhas being near the center of the city
- Coordinates: 41.38542°N 8.75063°W
- Country: Portugal
- District: Porto
- Metropolitan area: Porto metropolitan area
- City: Póvoa de Varzim

Moninhas is a neighbourhood of the Portuguese city of Póvoa de Varzim. Located in the south of Barreiros/Moninhas district, Moninhas is where the weekly fair of the city is located.

The most ancient reference to Moninhas appears in 1586, as Agra de Moninhas of Giesteira, in Póvoa's border. In the place, some ancient farming families existed, but the settlement of the neighbourhood seems to have occurred after the 16th century.

A fair has taken place in the community in previous years.
