= Rua da Junqueira =

Shopping street in Póvoa de Varzim City Center, Portugal

Coordinates: 41.3792711°N 8.7641525°W

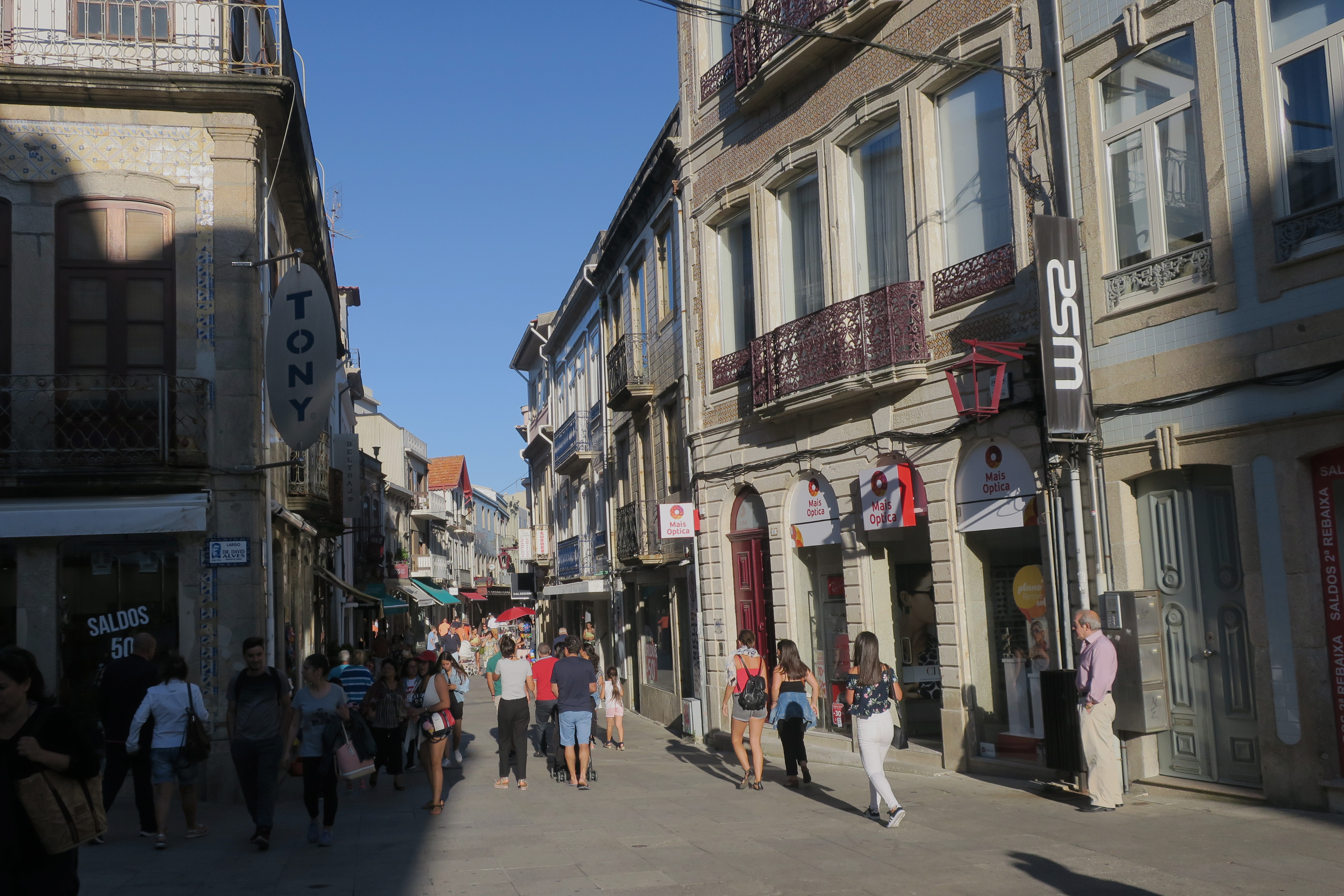
Junqueira is a traditional shopping street.

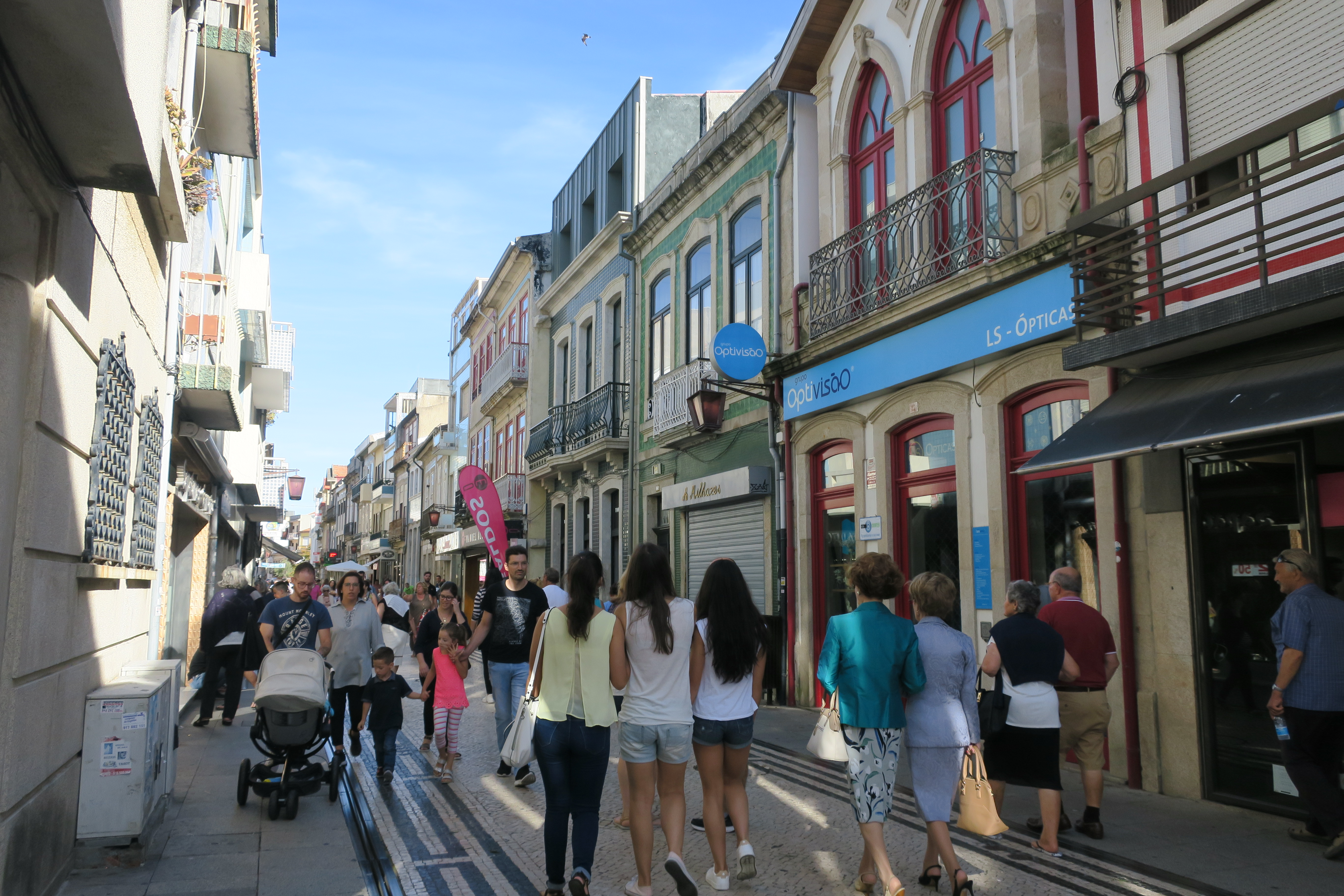
The street is rich in 19th and early 20th century historic architecture.

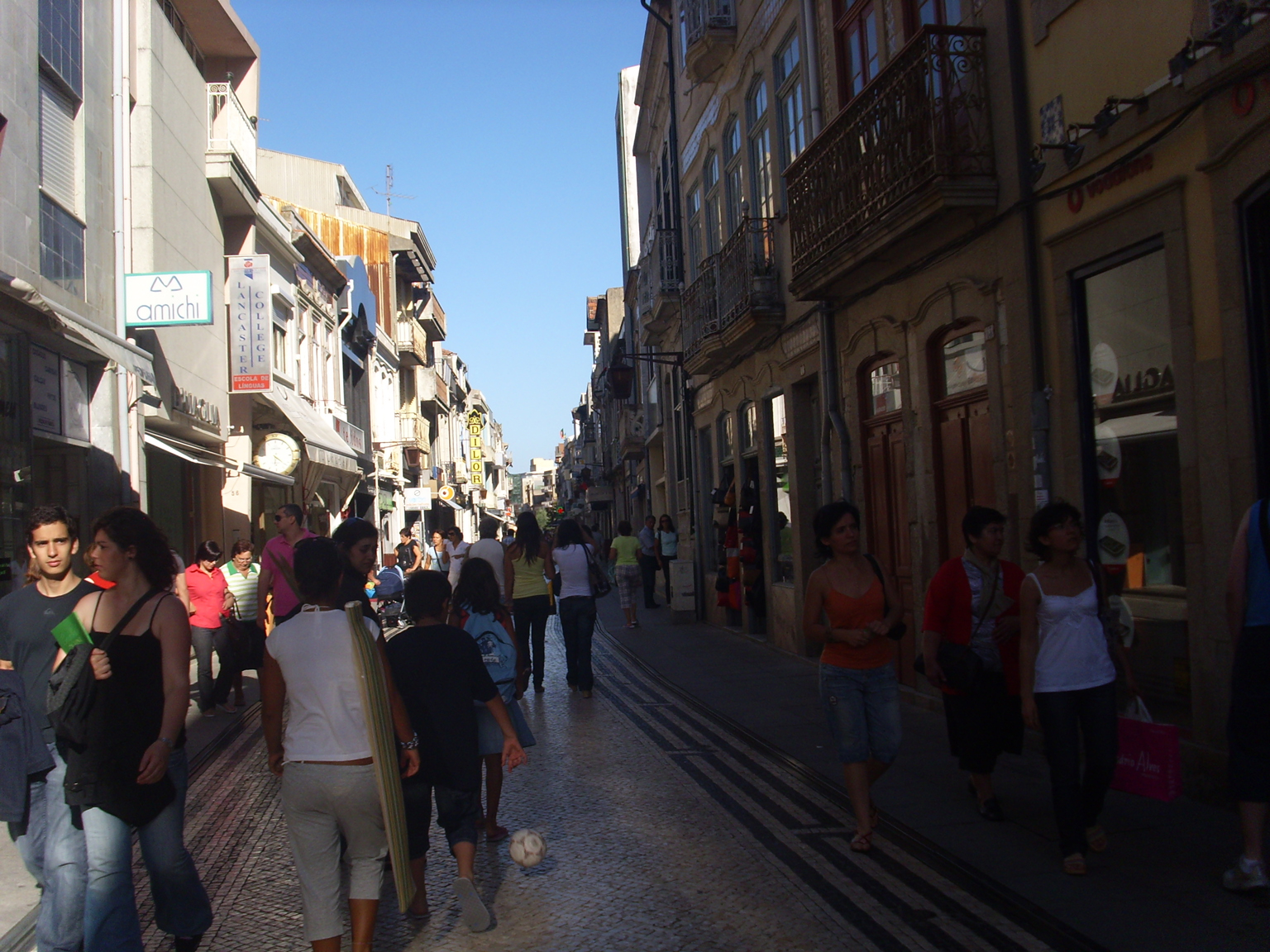
Another view of the street.

Rua da Junqueira, mostly known simply as Junqueira (European Portuguese: [ʒũˈkɐjɾɐ]), is a traditional shopping street in Póvoa de Varzim in Portugal. The street, located in Póvoa de Varzim City Center, it is the main and the oldest shopping street of the city, with several boutiques, some opened for over 100 years, and small shopping centers. Historic architecture was preserved and it is also the most popular tourist area outside the beach in Póvoa de Varzim, attracting millions of visitors. It is a landmark for the city and neighboring areas.

Junqueira also refers to the area surrounding this street. In early times it was a fishermen's district.

== History ==
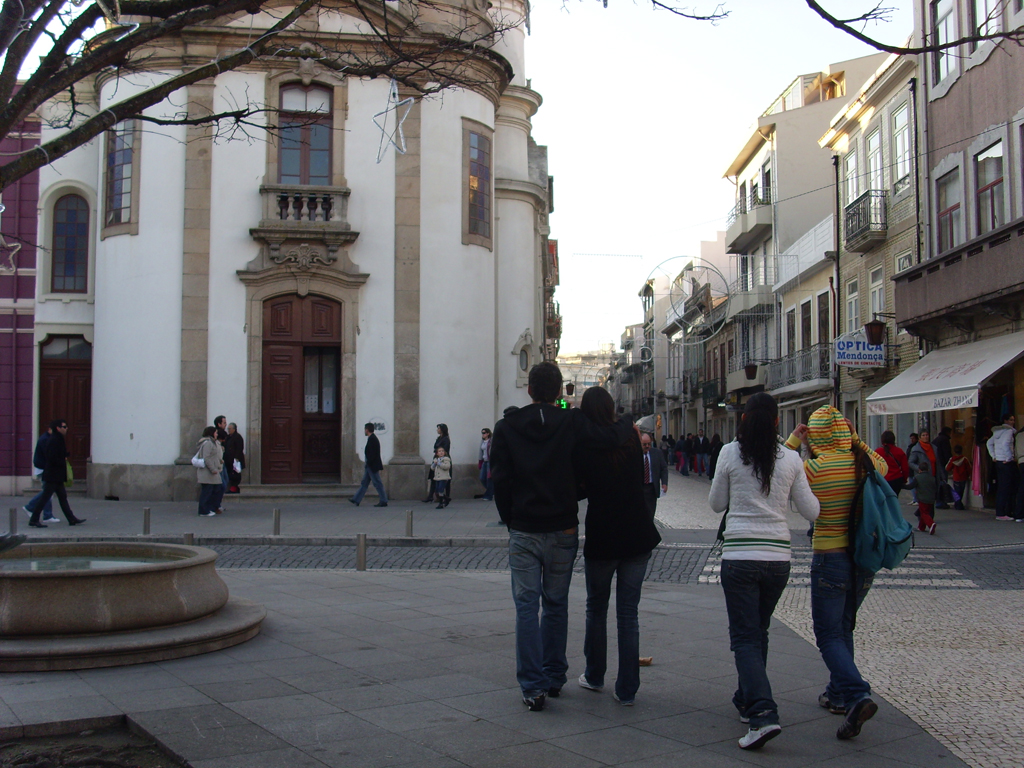
Junqueira as seen from República Square.

=== Early history ===
The axis of Rua da Junqueira street appeared in the written records, by the first time, in 1694 and was known as Rua de São Roque da Junqueira. But Junqueira is much older; several artifacts from the Roman Era were found in several street re-arraignments. It is considered part of Villa Euracini and could be the site of a Roman fish factory.

Junqueira probably takes its name from rushes (junco in Portuguese) that were found there before it was urbanized in the 18th century. Junqueira was wetland and old bridge ruins were found in the waterfront when the casino underground parking lot was being constructed in the late 1990s.

=== Junqueira, the town's early fishermen district ===
Lieutenant Francisco da Veiga Leal in the news of the Town of Póvoa de Varzim on May 24, 1758 spoke about this street: "At the end of the pavement that starts at the seashore there is a square where the Pillory is located, and from there the rua da Ponte street begins, and it keeps this name until the sands of the beach are reached, at the middle of its length the new street of Junqueira begins, it links with its street of Areosa and Senra, and the later with the suburb of old town". In 1762, the street had 49 houses on the left side and 29 on the right one; in 1792 it was inhabited, mostly, by fishermen families.

=== 18th century: The development of the shopping street by fish sellers ===
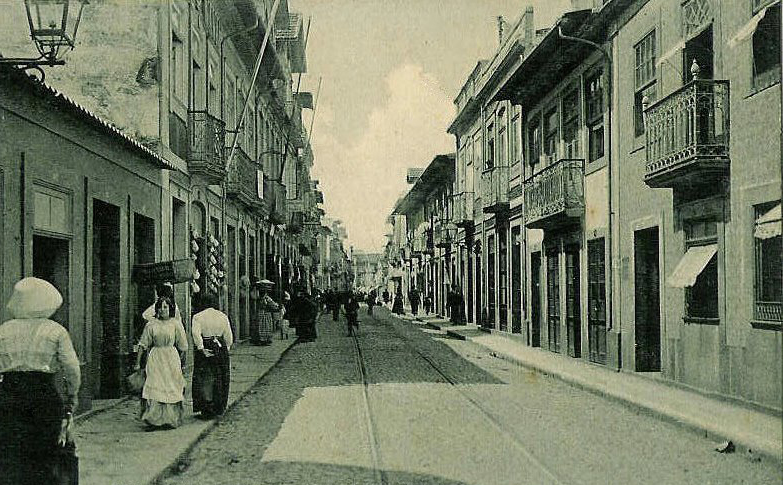
Junqueira in 1919.

In the 18th century, the area around Póvoa Fortress, known as "Ribeira", became the center of trade and fish brine, where several warehouses were located. In the New Street of Junqueira, fishermen, sellers, fish traders and beach goers started to implement the characteristic way-of-living of this street, it became one of the main ones in the city.

=== 19th century: A bourgeois Shopping street ===
In the 19th century, Junqueira became mostly used for commerce, where all kinds of goods could be found, by then it became dominated by the business bourgeoisie, and was seen as their living room to attend outsiders. Therefore, most of Póvoa's religious processions marched throw the street and balconies were decorated.

A narrow and twisted street, in the City Council meeting of October 30, 1839, it was stated: "the necessity to rectify the part of Junqueira since the Sam Roque square to the beginning of Hortas Street as it is well-known that being one of the busiest in town, it becomes impassable when it rains, due to a muddy area that forms in there with the street reduced to a narrow passage, and is common, that people, mules, oxen, and even litters passing over a pavement that is almost all ruined (...) the Street will have two sidewalks in each side made out of stonework with a line of stonework in the middle...". In 1856, the street kept with similar problems.

The first widening project appeared in 1876 and in February 1882, the city council decided to proceed with the widening using a project by architect Manuel Fortunato d’Oliveira Motta. This has no success due to the opposition of the landowners. After friendly attempts, the city hall appealed to the courts against the landowners that still opposed. These reforms took place during the 1893–1895 administration.

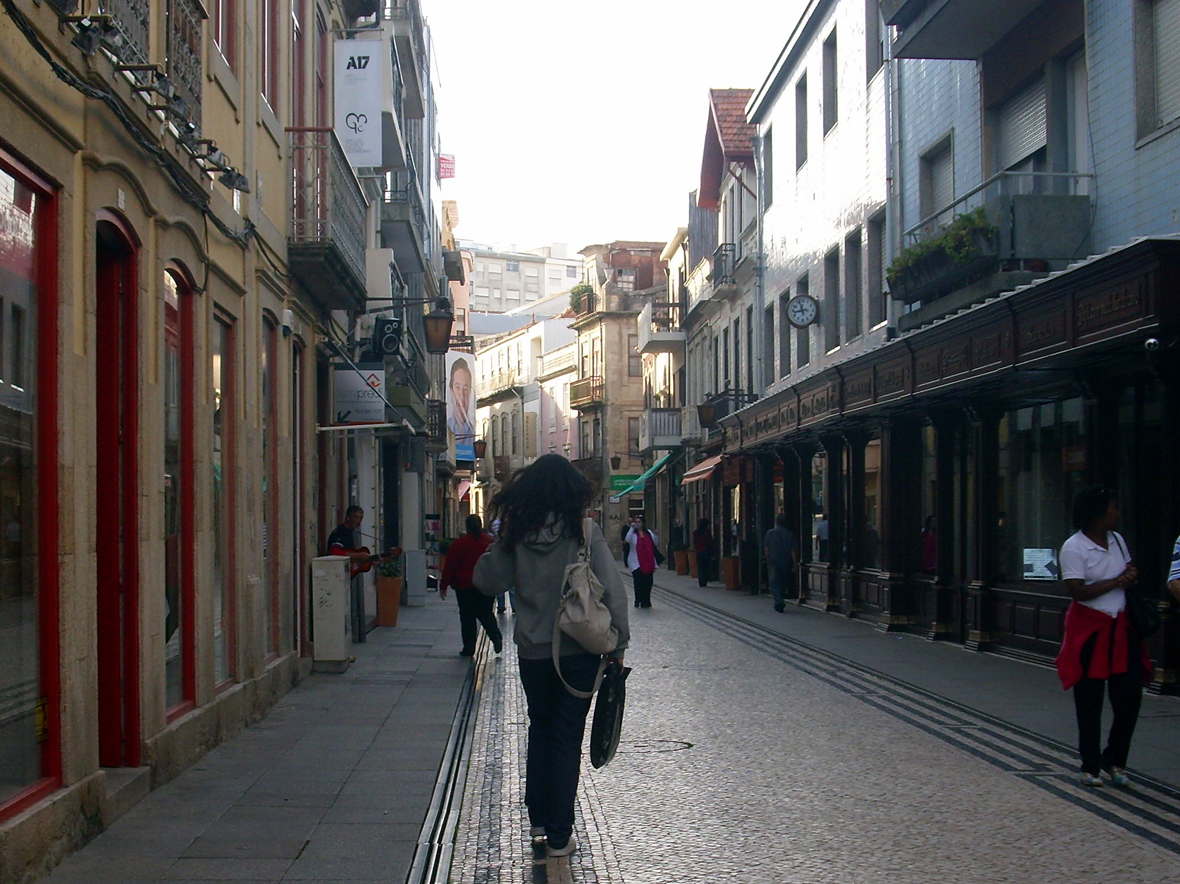
Near Ouriveraria Gomes goldsmithery, suppliers of the Portuguese Royal family.

A streetcar line through the Rua da Junqueira street existed at the end of the 19th century to the first decade of the 20th century; the tramline started in Praça do Almada and aimed to reach Baths Beach, later the tramline was transferred from Junqueira to the parallel Rua Tenente Valadim street.

=== The 20th century and pedestrianization ===
In the city council meeting July 2, 1912, after the implementation of the Republic, the alteration of street naming was determined and changed to 5 de Outubro Street, the day of the republican revolution. In 1926, it was written in a newspaper: "Councilmen are undeceived, while Póvoa remains as Póvoa, the Passeio Alegre will be Passeio Alegre and Junqueira street, Junqueira street". The official naming remained until January 1966.

Given its shopping nature, Junqueira street became pedestrian in 1955 by order of the mayor Major Mota, as such, it was one of the oldest in Portugal not allowing cars and "vehicles of any kind". The shopping and business importance of the street grew to such an extent, that today the street has not much people living in there.

== Urban morphology ==
Rua da Junqueira runs from the civic center located in Praça do Almada square to the waterfront in a perpendicular east-west axis. It is rich in 19th century and early 20th century architecture. It was once the street that people from Northern Portugal used to reach Póvoa's beaches and today, despite it lost its usefulness as a way to reach the waterfront, people still want to go throw the street.

The statue of Major Mota, the mayor responsible for pedestrianising the street, is located by the entrance of the street near Praça da República square. Some of the nearby streets and squares: Praça da República, Largo David Alves and the small pedestrianised streets of Sousa Campos, da Ponte, do Paredão, dos Cafés, da Alegria e Travessa do Cais Novo, also became pedestrian. In total, there is about one kilometer of pedestrian ways. Junqueira has squares in both ends: Praça da República Square (Praça da República) in the east end; and another located near the waterfront — the Largo David Alves Square (Largo David Alves).

This busy traditional street is well known for its jewelry. The most notable of its goldsmiths is Ourivesaria Gomes, where, during the Estado Novo, important people of the regime were often seen with their families. Open for more than 100 years, Ourivesaria Gomes was the goldsmithery of the Portuguese Royal House, and it had kings, nobility and the clergy as customers. The bullet used for the assassination attempt of Pope John Paul II was encrusted in the crown of Our Lady of Fatima by these goldsmiths. There are about 100 stores, some of them over a hundred years old, Shops are located on the ground floor of buildings; the other floors are, sometimes used as residences. These houses often have old Portuguese-style façades; the street is very narrow, which provides some protection from the prevailing wind and winter rain, and provides shade in summer.
