= Largo David Alves =

Square in Póvoa de Varzim, Portugal

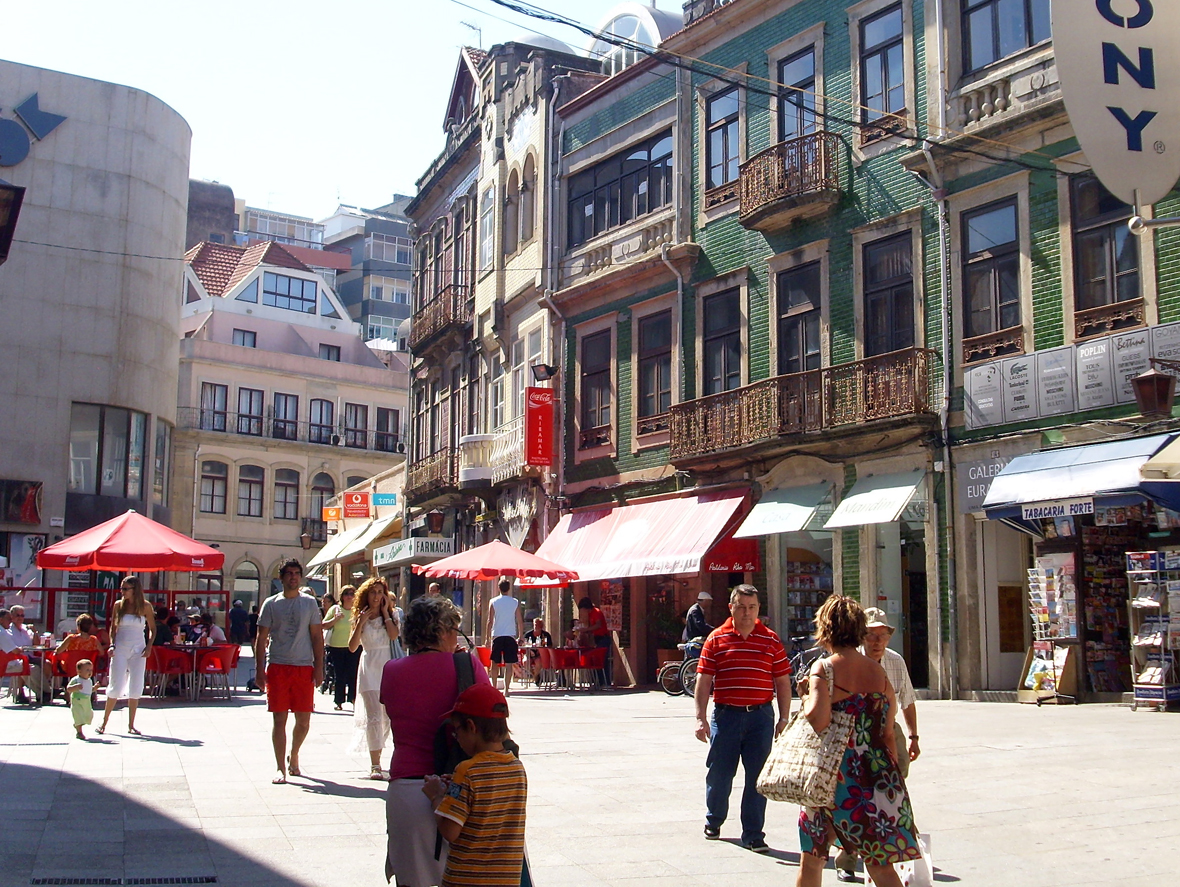
David Alves Square.

Largo David Alves square, historically called Largo do Café Chinês, is a small pedestrian square of the Portuguese city of Póvoa de Varzim, with about 500 square metres, which represents the golden age of Beach Póvoa in the 19th century. It was in the 19th century, a centre of culture, musical diversion, gambling and intellectual tertulia.

The plaza is acceded by small pedestrian streets, which for being short do not make it difficult to enter the square. David Alves is linked to the Praça da República and Praça do Almada, by Junqueira shopping street and to the beach, through the small Rua dos Cafés street, that celebrates the gambling coffee shops that prospered around the area of the square in the 19th century.

The charismatic square has the name of David Alves, who lived in the northern side of the square, and responsible for the beach district's urban development in the 19th century, and mayor between 1908 and 1910, he used the development and popularity that certain places, such as Póvoa, that in Europe's Atlantic coast were being used for therapeutic beach baths.

== History ==
In the beginning of the 18th century, Benedictine monks walked distances to take the "Baths of Póvoa", in search of iodine, considered invigorating, and cures for skin and bones problems throw sea and sun-baths. By the 19th century, the popularity increased with people from the provinces of Minho, Trás-os-Montes and Alto Douro that arrived by medical advice to cure several health problems, by breathing the air and diving in the rich iodine seawaters of Póvoa, in a popular movement that occurred in the European Atlantic coast since the 18th century, from Biarritz to Póvoa de Varzim.

During the Belle Epoque, this popularity is especially noticeable amongst the wealthiest classes and, especially, between the Portuguese-Brazilians (the Brasileiros), leading to the appearance of high culture venues. Several casinos, theatres and hotels were raised. In this early times, the square was known as Largo do Rego (Stream Square), because of a stream that passed throw there. The area by then started developing.

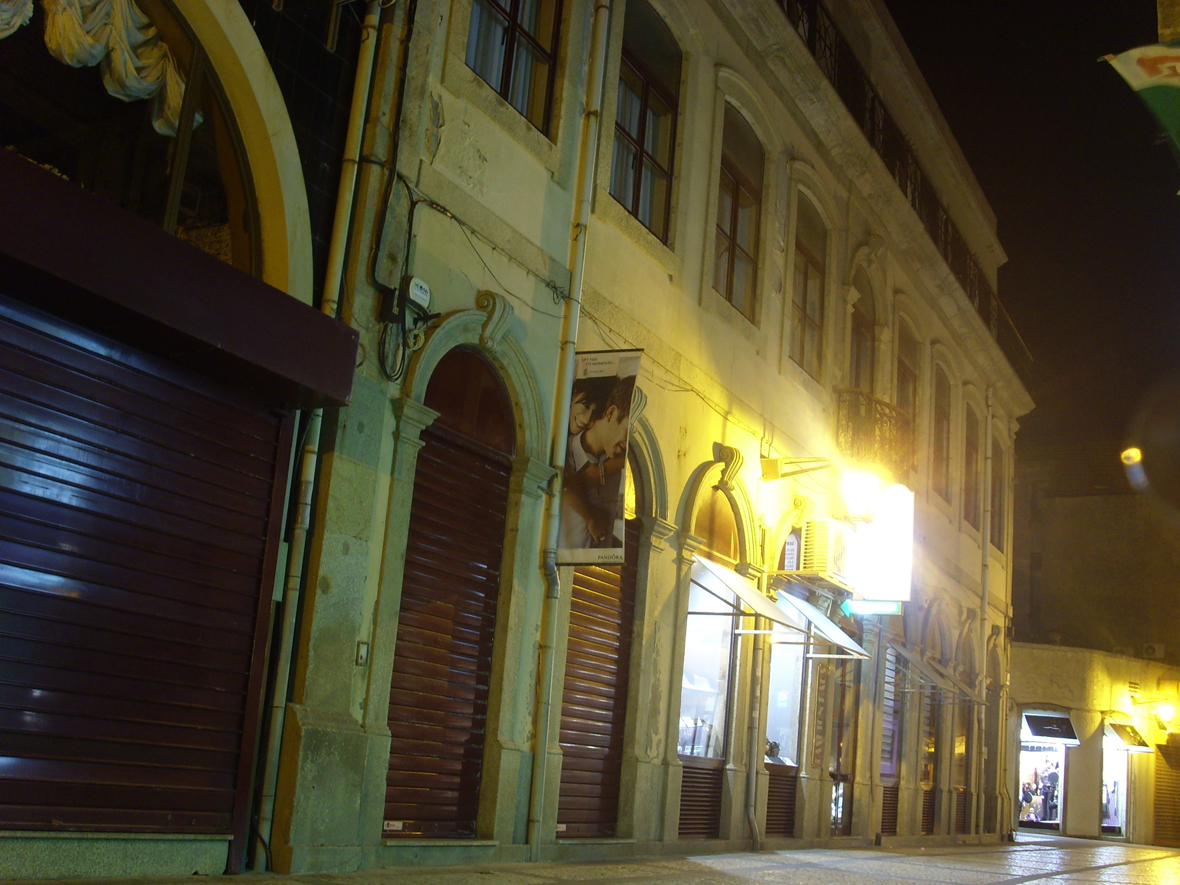
Former Luso-Brazileiro hotel and saloon.

Around Rego Square the most charismatic leisure venues of Póvoa in the 19th century appears, the Garrett Theatre, the Chinês Saloon, the Luso-Brasileiro (saloon and hotel), Café David with festival saloon and garden gambling, the Café Universal, the Aliança with hotel, amongst several other that hosted along with gambling, small orchestras and dancers. Centering the square, the Salão Chinês da Póvoa de Varzim appeared in 1882 and became famous all over the country and, with Café David, the most famous Póvoa casino, and by this the square got a new name - the Largo do Café Chinês, naming adopted on June 21, 1886. The elite could listen to music, watch "flamenco" and "can-can" shows by Spanish dancers, tertulias and play roulette and other table games. In these saloons, there were theatrical representations, concerts, concert dance and declamations. Businessmen, in competition, brought to Póvoa the best in performance arts, thus marking Póvoa the preferential place for national and international artists, especially Spanish.

It was with this background that Camilo Castelo Branco regularly came to Póvoa from 1873 to 1890, the year of his death. At first, he came by medical advice, he came back regularly, stating "This is the only beach in Portugal where the seafood aroma is not neutralized by the ladies wardrobes. One can see in here the old rush nature, the Cabeceiras majorat, and all the Fidalgos who dine hake with onion". In Café Chinês he lost amounts of money given by his publisher. When he was in Póvoa he lived in the old Luso-Brazileiro Hotel, with the advantage of neighboring the Café Chinês saloon and, throw there, the streetcars passed in the way to the train station, it was in there he wrote part of his vast written works.

Camilo met with intellectuals and people with social notability, such as the father of Eça de Queirós, José Maria d'Almeida Teixeira de Queirós, judge and peer of the kingdom, Alexandre Herculano, António Feliciano de Castilho, the Povoan playwright and poet Francisco Gomes de Amorim and his personal friend Almeida Garrett, and other notable people.

Francisco Peixoto Bourbon told that Camilo "having dated a Spanish performer, with a lot of "salero", and expensed, with the maintenance of the diva, more than what he was able to spend, he then went gambling in the hope he could multiply his savings, and, as a rule, he lost everything and contracted a gaming debt, that then was called an honor debt." On September 17th of 1877, Camilo saw his 19-year-old favorite son, Manuel Plácido, dying in Póvoa, he was buried in the Dores Square cemetery.

On August 12, 1889, the new name "Largo do Café David" for the square was adopted, that didn't become popular, the people kept naming the square as "Largo do Café Chinês" or, simply, "Largo do Chinês". Sir João de Castro in the Summer of 1893, suffering from melancholy and anemia comes to Póvoa by medical advice, he says that early in the evening he had supper between capitalists and proprietors and later went "had a cup of coffee in Chinês or the Luso-Brasileiro, with the eyes craved in the stage were a blind lady sang every night with nostalgic fainting." D. António da Costa in his book No Minho (1900) states "In the evening downtown is awfully busy, where the saloons and hotel de Itália are located, whose owner, the celebrated actress Ernestina, during the day runs the hotel and at night stages as first lady in the theater. It is in the same hotel the assembly, in whose saloon crowded by families that dance with joy every night", and notices "the saloons are luxurious, as any other in Portugal, and each one with a gambling room. The David one is not as luxurious as the one from Hotel de Itália, but suppresses in ornamentation; paper and furniture with Chinese style, ten tall mirrors, lusters, armchairs, statues, pictures. (...) it is nicknamed the Gambling Temple." João Paulo Freire, in the book Pelas Terras do Norte (1926) says that "at night he went to Café Chinês; extremely interesting, rooms with motives of the old empire of the Sun, wide, full of light and full of people."

The disappearance of the gambling saloons occurs at the time of the construction of Casino da Póvoa on February 28, 1930, in nearby Passeio Alegre square. The casino opens to the general public in 1934. Café Chinês is demolished in 1938, and in the saloon site the Póvoa Cine theater is built. Póvoa Cine became a charismatic movie theater.José Régio watched in there the daily movie sessions, but the building was also demolished in the 1990s, when a shopping center was built. By proposition of the mayor Abílio Garcia de Carvalho, the square became known as Largo Dr. David Alves on October 8, 1938.
