= Póvoa de Varzim =

- Municipality
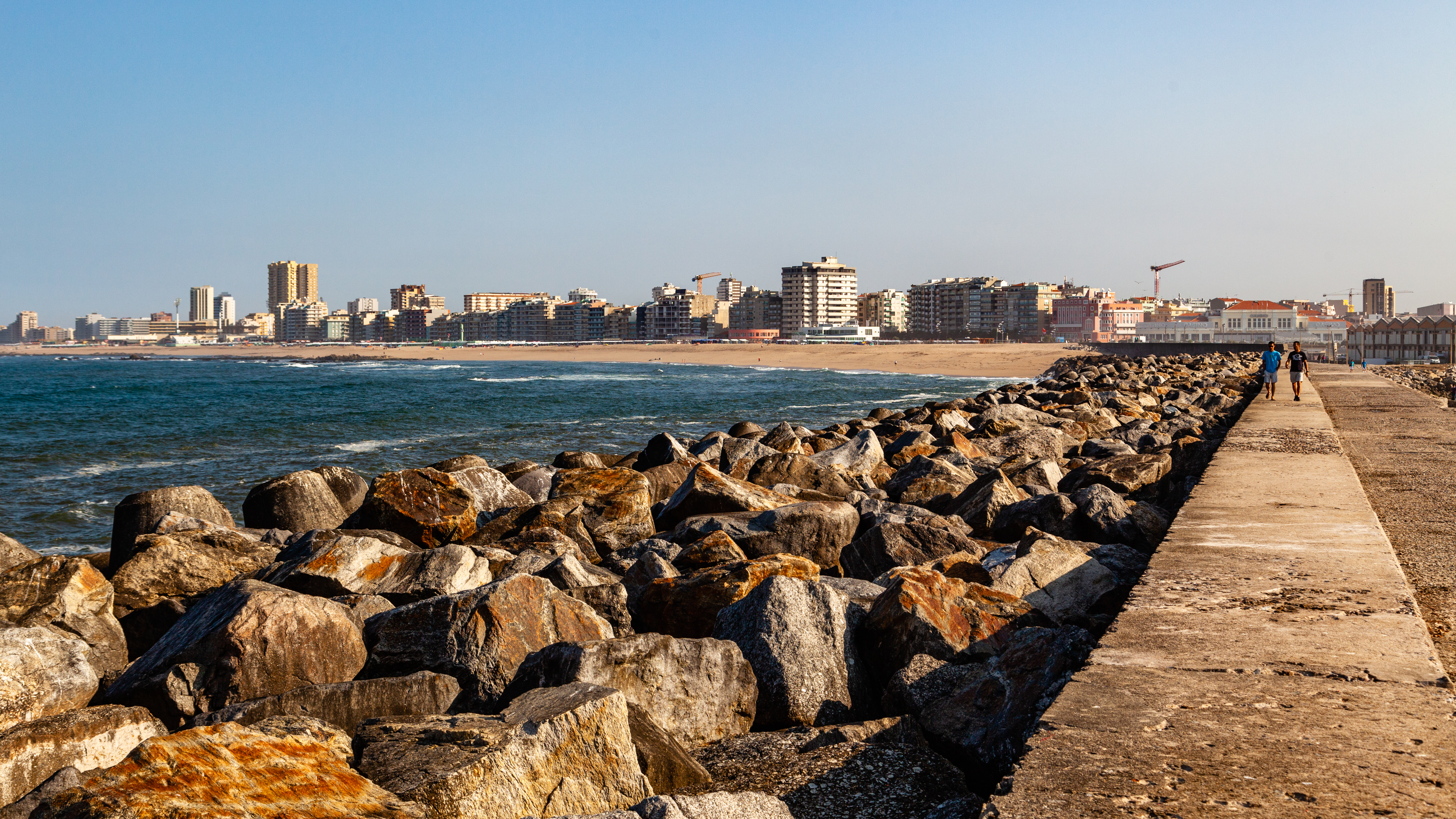
- Panorama of Póvoa de Varzim

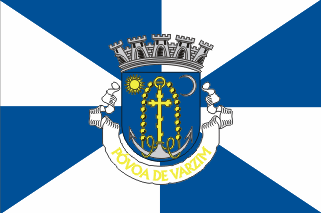
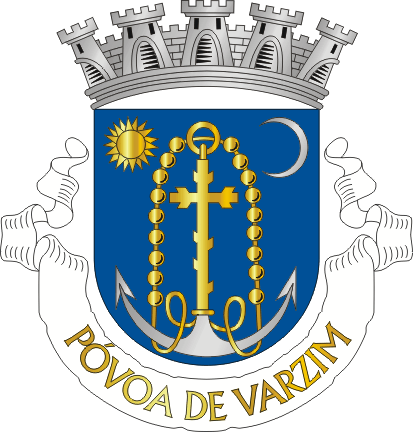
- Flag Coat of arms
- Interactive map of Póvoa de Varzim
- Location in Portugal
- Coordinates: 41°22′48″N 8°45′39″W
- Country: Portugal
- Region: Norte
- Metropolitan area: Porto
- District: Porto
- Established: Roman settlement: c. 138 BC; Municipal charter: 9 March 1308

Government
  - President: Andrea Silva (PSD)

Area
  - Total: 82.1 km^{2} (31.7 sq mi)
- Elevation: 190 m (620 ft)
- Highest elevation: 202 m (663 ft)
- Lowest elevation: 0 m (0 ft)

Population (2025)
  - Total: 72,364
  - Density: 881/km^{2} (2,280/sq mi)
- Time zone: UTC+00:00 (WET)
  - Summer (DST): UTC+01:00 (WEST)
- Postal code: 4490-000 — 4490-999, 4494-909, 4495-001 — 4495-613, 4496-903, 4750-010 — 4750-554
- Area code: 252
- Local holiday: 29 June
- Website: www.cm-pvarzim.pt

Póvoa de Varzim (European Portuguese pronunciation: [ˈpɔvu.ɐ ðɨ vɐɾˈzĩ]) is a Portuguese city in Northern Portugal and sub-region of Greater Porto, 30 km (18.6 mi) from its city centre. It sits in a sandy coastal plain, a cuspate foreland, halfway between the Minho and Douro rivers. In 2025, the municipality had an estimated population of 72,364. The city expanded southwards, to Vila do Conde, and there are about 100,000 inhabitants in the urban area alone. It is the seventh-largest urban agglomeration in Portugal and the third largest in Northern Portugal.

Permanent settlement in Póvoa de Varzim dates back to around four to six thousand years ago. Around 900 BC, unrest in the region led to the establishment of Cividade de Terroso, a fortified city, which developed maritime trade routes with the civilizations of classical antiquity. Modern Póvoa de Varzim emerged after the conquest by the Roman Republic of the city by 138 BC; fishing and fish processing units soon developed, which became the foundations of the local economy. By the 11th century, the fishing industry and fertile farmlands were the economic base of a feudal lordship and Varzim was fiercely disputed between the local overlords and the early Portuguese kings, which resulted in the establishment of the present day's municipality in 1308 and being subjugated to monastic power some years later. Póvoa de Varzim's importance reemerged with the Age of Discovery due to its shipbuilders and merchants proficiency and wealth, who traded around the globe in complex trade routes. By the 17th century, the fish processing industry rebounded and, sometime later, Póvoa became the dominant fishing port in Northern Portugal.

Póvoa de Varzim has been a well-known beach resort for over three centuries, the most popular in Northern Portugal, which unfolded an influential literary culture and historical-artistic patronage in music and theater. Casino da Póvoa is one of the few and prominent gambling venues in Portugal. Leisure and health benefits provided in large sandy beaches attracts national and international visitors. Póvoa de Varzim holds other landmarks, especially the traditional Junqueira shopping street, Garrett Theatre, the Ethnography and History Museum, Cividade de Terroso, the Medieval Rates Monastery, Baroque Matriz Church, city Hall and Portuguese vernacular architecture in Praça do Almada, and numerous Portuguese cuisine restaurants that make Póvoa de Varzim popular in all Northern Portugal, which started to attract an international following. Farol da Lapa, Farol de Regufe, the main breakwater of the Port of Póvoa de Varzim, Carvalhido and São Félix Hill are preferred for sightseeing. The city has significant textile and food industries. The town has retained a distinct cultural identity and ancient Norse customs such as the writing system of siglas poveiras, the masseira farming technique and festivals.

== History ==
=== Castro Culture and Roman conquest ===
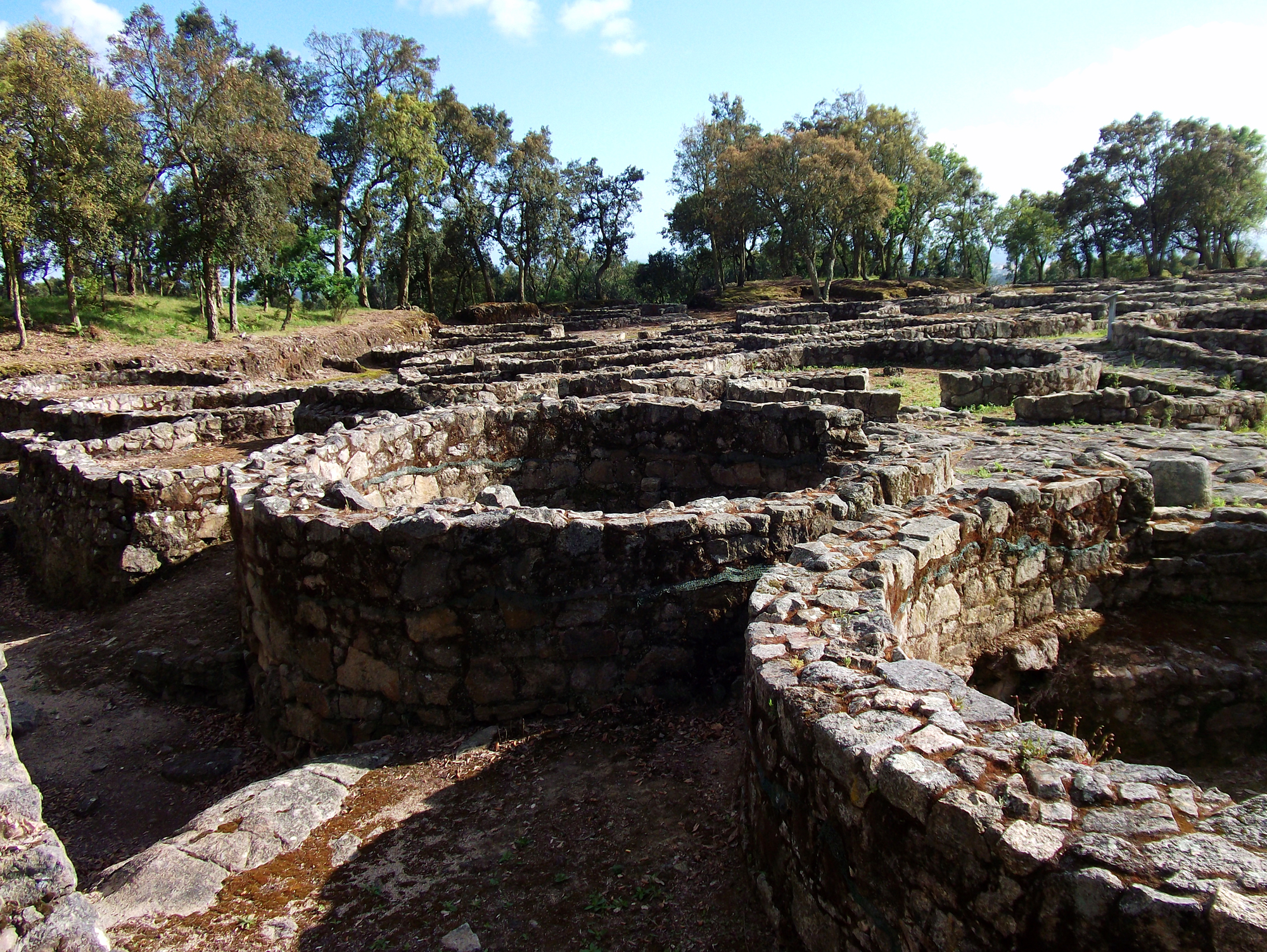
The first granite buildings appeared in the 5th century BC.

Discoveries of Acheulean stone tools suggest Póvoa de Varzim has been inhabited since the Lower Palaeolithic, around 200,000 BC. The first groups of shepherds settled on the coast where Póvoa de Varzim is now located between the 4th millennium and early 2nd millennium BC. A Neolithic-Calcolithic necropolis, with seven known burial mounds, can still be seen around São Félix Hill and Cividade Hill.

Widespread pillaging by rival and migrant tribes led the resident populations of the coastal plain of Póvoa de Varzim to raise a town atop the hill that stood next to the sea. The acropolis protection was reinforced by successive rings of walls and a trench at the base of the hill. Established by the 9th or 8th century B.C., the city area covered 12,000 m^{2} (3.0 acres) and had several hundred inhabitants. Its location near waterways helped it to maintain commercial relations with the Mediterranean civilizations, especially noticeable during the Carthaginian dominion of the southern Iberian Peninsula.

During the Punic Wars, the Romans became aware of the Castro region's rich deposits of gold and tin. Viriathus, leading Lusitanian troops, hindered the expansion of the Roman Republic north of the river Douro. His murder in 138 BC opened the way for the Roman legions. Over the following two years, Decimus Junius Brutus advanced into the Castro region from south of the Douro, crushed the Castro armies, and left Cividade de Terroso, in ruins.

The region was pacified during the reign of Caesar Augustus and the Castro people returned to the coastal plain, where Villa Euracini and Roman fish factories were built. With the annexation by the Roman Republic, trading supported regional economic development, with Roman merchants organized in true commercial companies who looked for monopoly in commercial relations.

=== Feudalism and municipalism ===
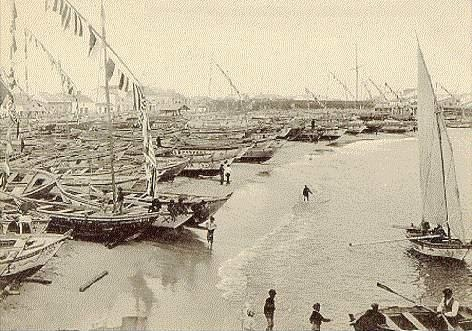
Poveiro boats in the Port of Póvoa de Varzim; the dispute between the fief's overlords and the Portuguese kings led to the establishment of the municipality in 1308.

With the fall of the Roman Empire, Suebi populations established themselves in the countryside. It was first mentioned on 26 March 953 during the rule of Mumadona Dias, Countess of Portugal. The region was attacked by the Vikings in the 960s, by the Moors in 997 and again by Norman pirates in 1015–1016. Hints indicate a Norse settlement in Villa Euracini after those invasions. During the Middle Ages, the name Euracini evolved to Uracini, Vracini, Veracini, Verazini, Verazim, Varazim and, eventually, Varzim.

In 1033, Guterre Pelayo, a leading captain of the Reconquista for the County of Portugal, was recognized by Bermudo, Emperor in Gallaecia, as the Lord of Varzim, during the chaotic epoch following Almanzor's attack on the Christian realms. Henry, the Portuguese count, recognized his rule over the port of Varzim amongst several other possessions. Varzim overlords gained significant power and, when Portugal was already a stable kingdom, Sancho I of Portugal attacked the fief and seized the port, destroyed most of the properties and expelled the farmers. The northern area became known as Varzim dos Cavaleiros (Knights' Varzim) and belonged to the military order of the Knights Hospitaller, who inherited the wealth of the local overlords. Lower Varzim, the royal southern land, was the location of the port and contiguous farmlands.

According to a 1258 chronic, while Sancho II of Portugal was disputing the throne with his brother, Afonso, who was invited by the knights to take over the Portuguese throne, Gavião of Varzim used the opportunity to destroy the king's assets in Lower Varzim. He violently entered in the king's lands, destroyed it significantly, in such a way that no bread could be sowed, nor a car could cross that place as it often used to do. Sancho II was overthrown, Afonso became king and ordered the resettlement of the royal land and the king's chronicler explicitly stated that all the port was the property of the king.

Gomes Lourenço, of the Honour of Varzim, was a very influential knight and godfather of King Denis. He took advantage of his relationship with important people in the kingdom in order to get the recognition of the seaport, located in Lower Varzim, as his honour. He tried to convince King Denis, that the king's father, Afonso, took it from him unfairly. Justifying the attitude with the Honour of Varzim, Gomes and his descendants went to the port to get the tribute from the fishermen.

In 1308, King Denis granted a charter, the Foral, giving the royal land to 54 families of Varzim; these had to found a municipality known as Póvoa around Praça Velha, siding Varzim Old Town, controlled by the knights. In 1312, King Denis donated Póvoa to his bastard son, Afonso Sanches, Lord of Albuquerque, who included it in the patrimony of the Monastery of Santa Clara, which he had just founded in Vila do Conde. In 1367, King Ferdinand I confirmed the charters, privileges and uses of Póvoa de Varzim. These were again confirmed by John I in 1387. But the domain of the monastery over the town grew stronger and the people asked King Manuel I to end the situation. In 1514, during the era of charter reform, the King granted a new charter to Póvoa de Varzim. Besides the town hall and square, the town gained a pillory, granted significant self-government, and involved itself in the Portuguese discoveries.

=== Shipbuilders, seafarers and fishermen ===
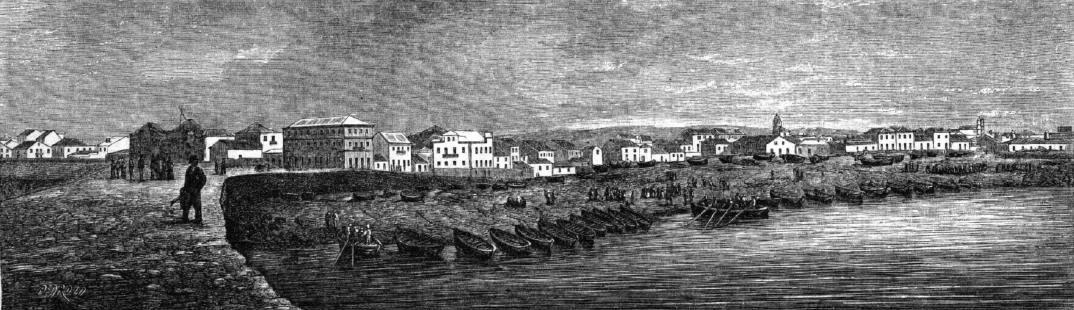
Mid-19th century skyline as seen from Ribeira shipyard, located in the port of Póvoa de Varzim.

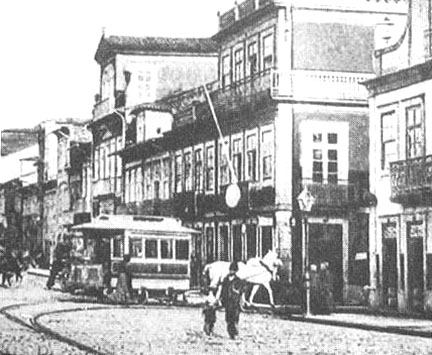
A horse-drawn tram or streetcar on Praça do Almada around 1880.

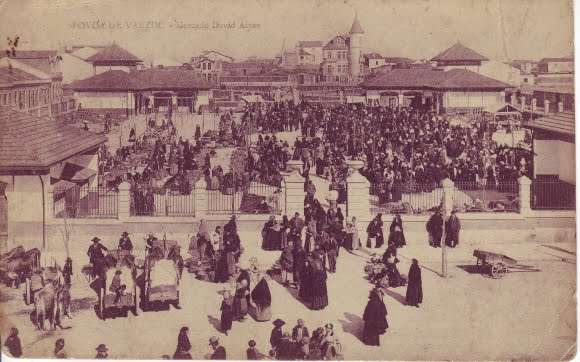
The market square in 1909.

In the 16th century, the fishermen started to work in maritime activities, as pilots or seafarers in the crew of the Portuguese ships, due to their high nautical knowledge. The fishermen of the region are known to fish in Newfoundland since at least 1506. During the reign of John III the Povoan shipmaking art was already renowned, and Povoan carpenters were sought after by Lisbon's Ribeira das Naus shipyard due to their high technical skills. The single-floored houses dominated the town's landscape, but there are indications of multiple floored habitations with rich architecture. The seafarers' social class, well-off gentlemen, was associated with this richer architecture around Praça Velha square.

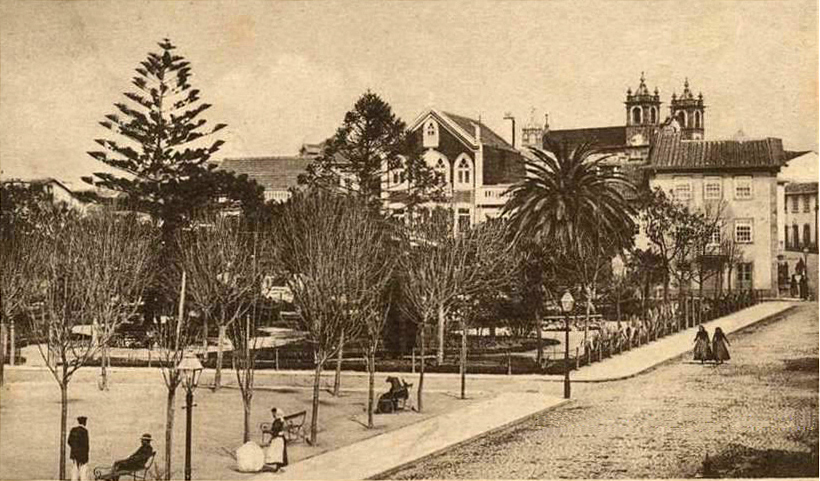
Praça do Almada square garden in 1919.

In the 17th century, the shipbuilding industry boomed in Ribeira, area around Póvoa Fortress in the sheltered bay, and one third of the population had some relation with this activity, building ships for the merchant navigation. During this period there was a relevant urban expansion: the Praça civic center with the town hall and the Madre Deus Chapel, the area of the old town where the Main church was located and the fishermen neighborhood of Junqueira was starting its affirmation as a new urban center.

In the beginning of the 18th century, there was a decline in the Ribeira shipyard activities, due to the aggradation of the Portuguese coast and the Povoan shipyard started to work in the construction of fishing vessels. There was a significant increase of the fisher community in the middle of the century, becoming the main activity, and during the reign of Joseph I with the country in the middle of an economic crisis, Póvoa started a rapid development. The Royal Academy of Sciences of Lisbon noticed their overwhelming notoriety in the Minho coast and considered Povoans to be the most expert fishermen from Cape St. Vincent to Caminha, with a sizable number of fishermen, ships and high sea fishing. The result was a very considerable quantity of caught fish.

The community became wealthier and, following a royal provision by Queen Mary I in 1791, the inspector general Almada reorganized the town's layout, a new civic centre with a monumental city hall, streets and infrastructure were built, all of which provided the potential for a new business — sea baths.

=== The Baths of Póvoa and the modern city ===
Since 1725, the iodine-rich seawaters of Póvoa, due to the peculiar high quantities of seaweed that ends up in Póvoa beaches from the sheltered bay to Cape Santo André, brought by ocean currents, lead that Benedictine monks choose to take sea-baths in there, searching cures for skin and bone problems. Still in the 18th century, other people went to Póvoa with the same concerns. In the 19th century, the town became popular as a summer destination for the wealthy of Entre-Douro-e-Minho province and Portuguese Brazilians, due to its large sandy beaches and the development of theaters, hotels and casinos. It then became renowned for its refined literary culture, artistic patronage in music and theater, and intellectual tertulia.

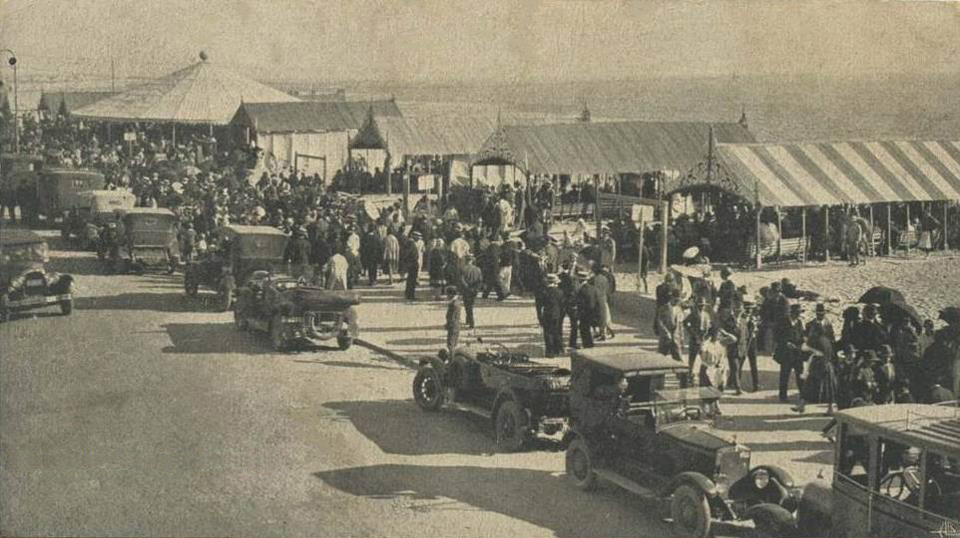
Avenida dos Banhos in 1921.

On 27 February 1892, a shipwreck had impact in community. Seven lanchas poveiras wrecked in a storm and 105 fishermen were killed, just metres off the shore. Over-fishing by steamboats created severe social problems and fishermen emigration. The fishing industry lost much of its importance. Meanwhile, Póvoa developed into the most popular holiday destination in northern Portugal, The textile and food industries thrived. Streetcars appeared in 1874 and endured until September 1934. The rail connection to Porto opened in 1875 and to inland Minho region in 1878. National highways linking the city to Barcelos, Famalicão and Viana do Castelo opened. The first urbanization project for the waterfront was drafted in 1891. All these events led to a major growth between the 1930s and 1960s.

Póvoa de Varzim developed a cosmopolitan style and became a service-sector city. It is one of northern Portugal's main urban centres. Póvoa is the focal point of a larger area, which includes Vila do Conde and Esposende.

== Geography ==
Parish map of Póvoa de Varzim.

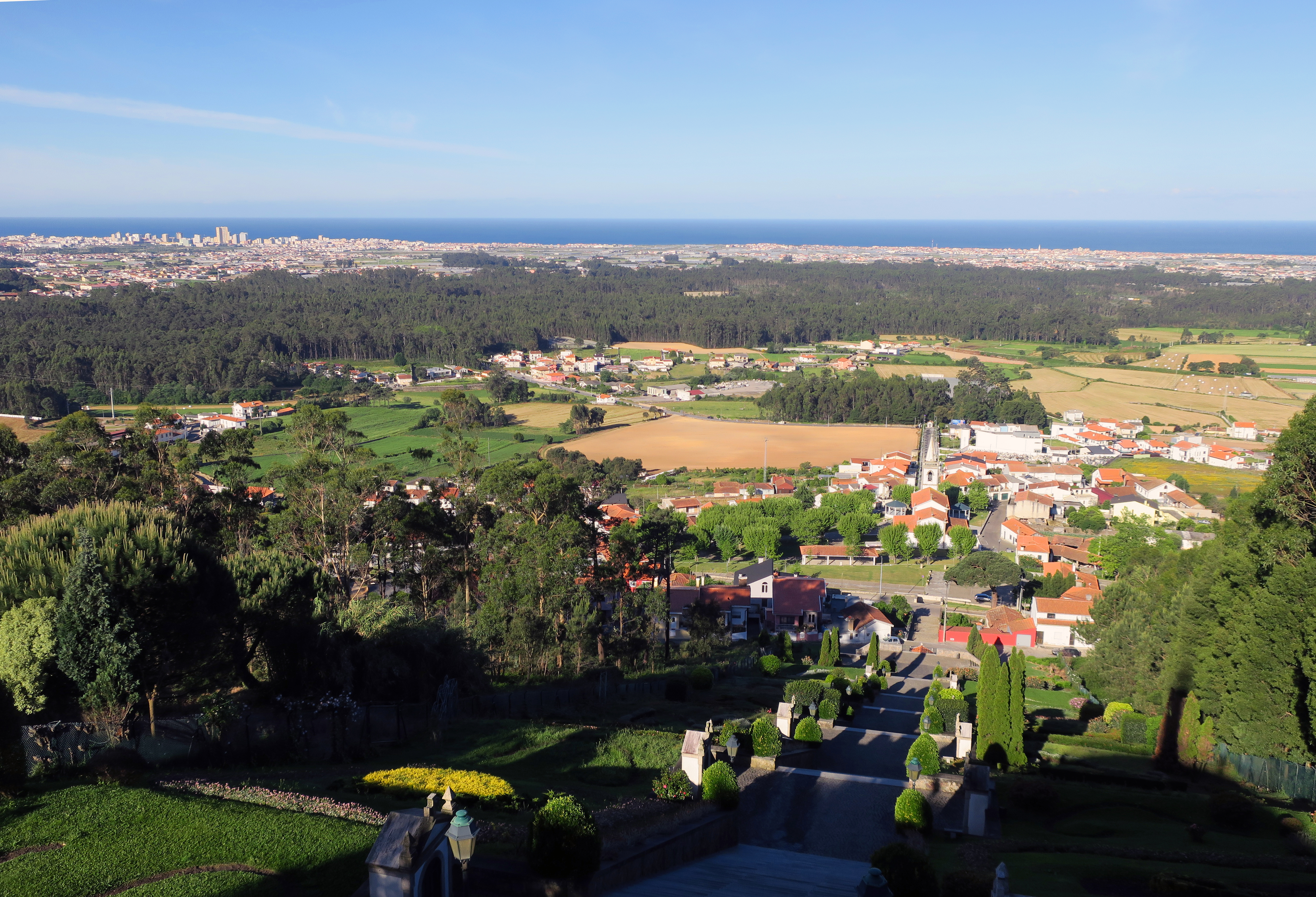
The coastal plain. The city and its suburbs are surrounded by bouça forests.

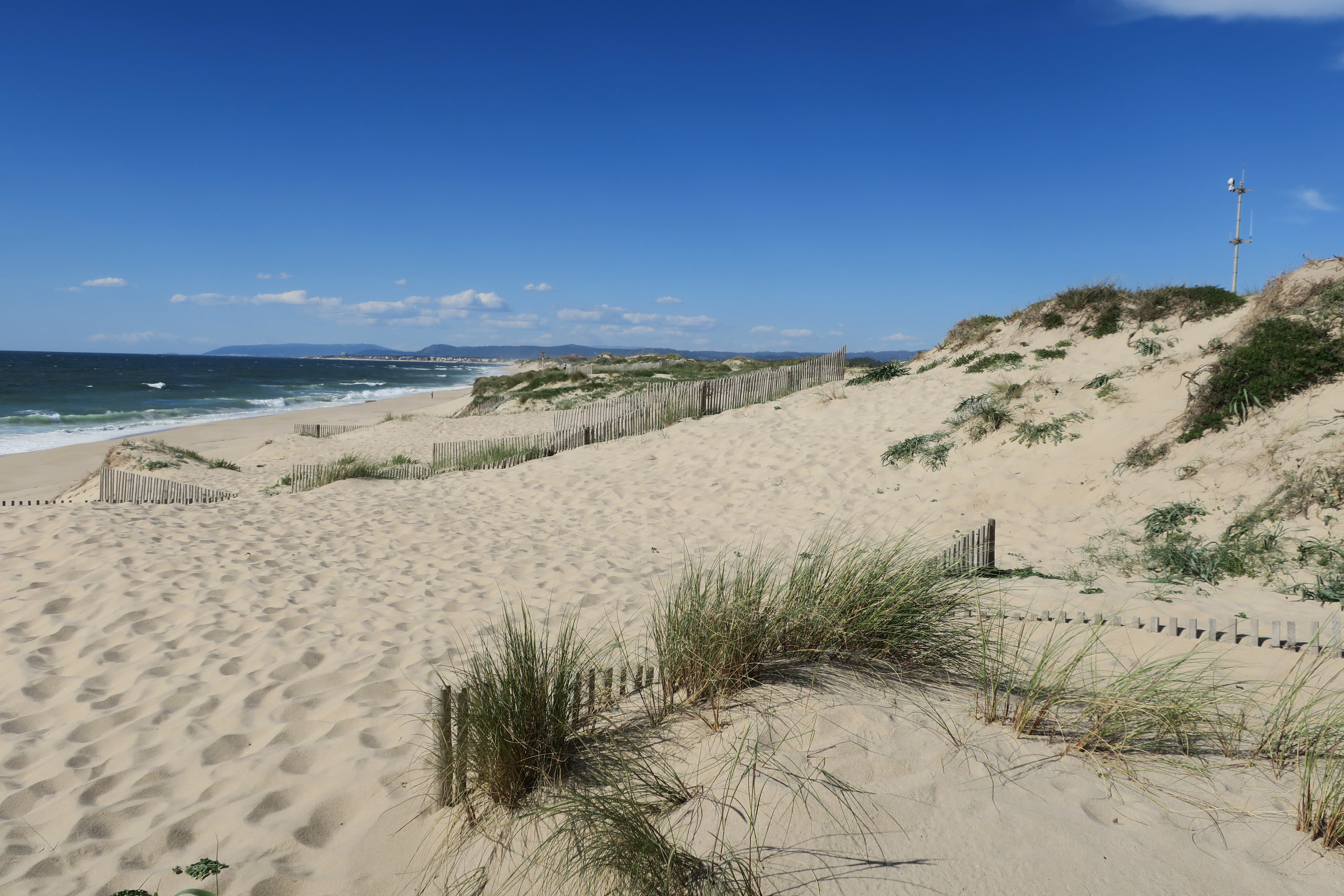
Coastal sand dunes with endemic psammophiles. Minho rocky cliffs seen at a distance.

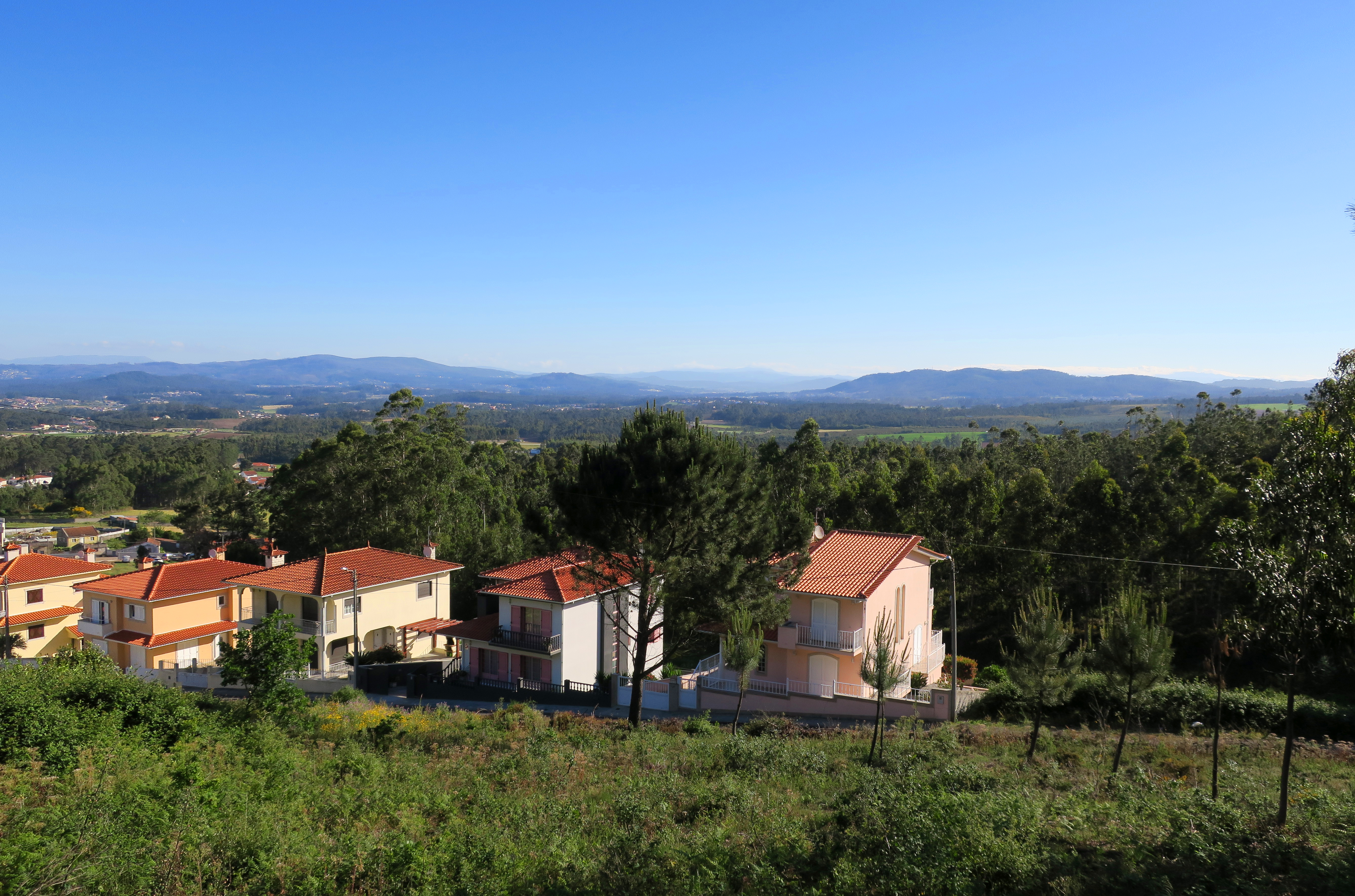
The green inland hills has higher pluviosity and lower maritime influence.

Occupying an area of 82.1 km^{2} (31.7 sq mi), Póvoa de Varzim lies between the Cávado and Ave rivers, or, from a wider perspective, halfway between the Minho and Douro rivers on the northern coast of Portugal — the Costa Verde. It is bordered to the north by the municipality of Esposende, to the northeast by Barcelos, to the east by Vila Nova de Famalicão, and to the south by Vila do Conde. To the west, it has a shoreline on the Atlantic Ocean.

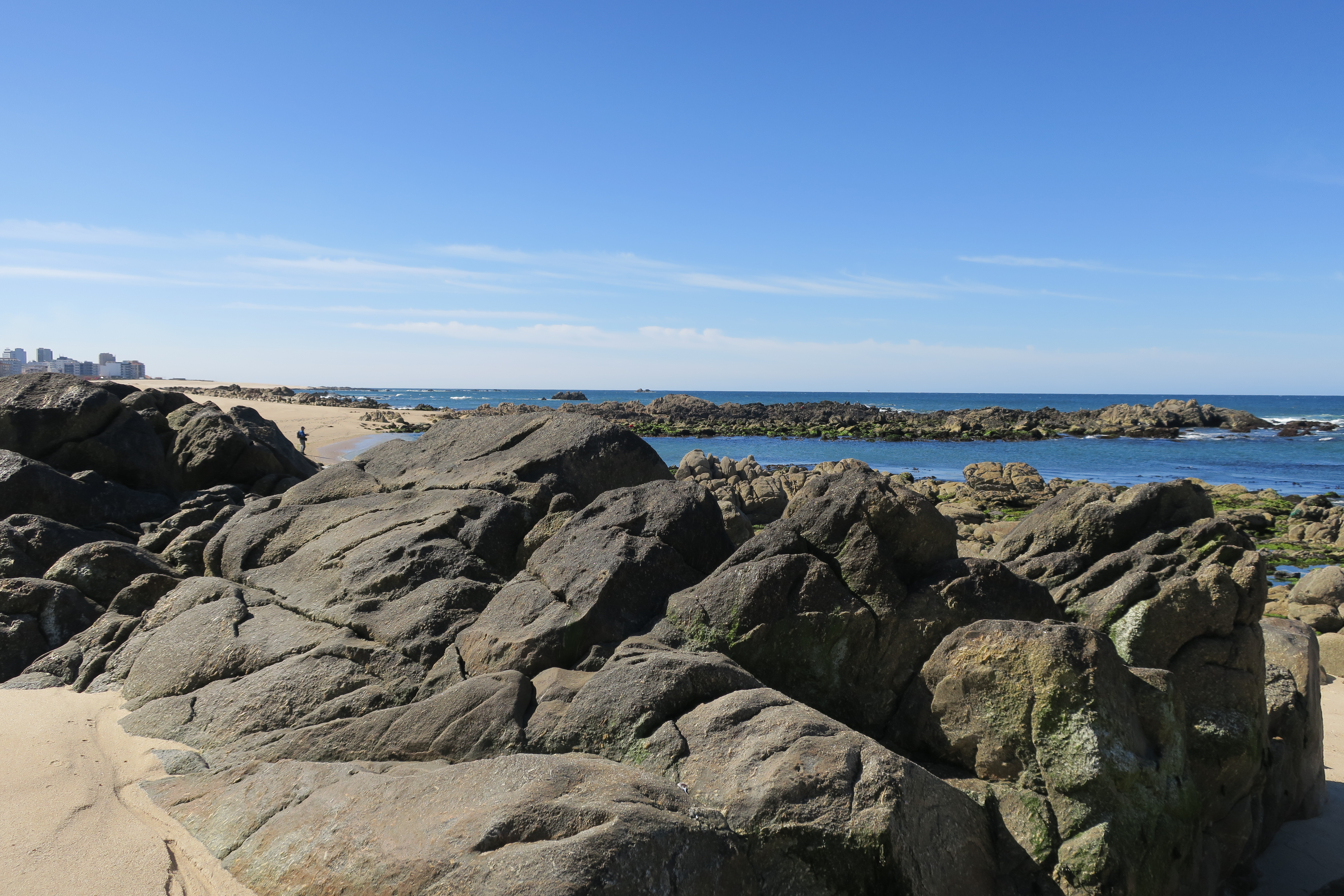
Granitic gneiss. The gneiss forms headlands and islets which submerge during high tide.

The rocky cliffs, common features downstream of the Minho's estuary, disappear in Póvoa de Varzim, giving way to a coastal plain. The plain is located in a cuspate foreland, an old marine plateau from the Plio-Pleistocene, conferring a sandy soil to the coastal lands. The sand dunes in the Northwestern coast formed during the Little Ice Age and started piling up in the 15th or 16th century. Wandering along the coast one discerns Cape Santo André, the tip of the cuspate foreland and the Avarus Promontory, referred to by Ptolemy.

São Félix Hill (202 m or 663 ft) and Cividade Hill (155 m or 509 ft) rise above the landscape. Despite their modest rise, the expanse of the plain makes them easy reference points on the horizon. The mountain chain known as Serra de Rates divides the municipality into two distinctive areas: the coastal plain and hills where the forests become more abundant and the soils have less sea influence. In this landscape dominated by the plains and low hills, only the hillside of Corga da Soalheira (150 m or 490 ft) in the interior, is dissimilar.

There are no large rivers, but abundant small water streams exist. Some of these streams are permanent, such as the Este River, which feeds into the Ave. The source of the Esteiro Stream is located at the base of Cividade Hill and empties at the beach of Aver-o-Mar, while the Alto River's source is at the base of São Félix and reaches the Atlantic at Rio Alto Beach. The land is well-irrigated, springs and wells are very common since underground water is often close to the surface.

The forest areas suffer from strong demographic pressure and intensive agriculture. Some forests locally known as bouças are defined areas with maritime pines, oaks and eucalyptus plantations. Forests are still important in parishes surrounded by the Serra de Rates, whose flora is distinguished by the pedunculate oak or the european holly. In the 18th century, the monks of Tibães planted pines, which characterized the civil parish of Estela. In the past the Atlantic forest predominated, with trees such as oaks, ash trees, hazels, strawberry trees, holm oak, and alders.

The granitic gneiss rocks throughout the entire coastline are home to large populations of invertebrates, fish and seaweed. These gneiss and the dunes form rich ecosystems, but are threatened by waterfront construction, holiday-makers and dune sports.

Short-beaked common dolphins occur in large numbers in Northern Portugal. Dolphins show themselves by porpoising and bowriding along with boats just off the city of Póvoa de Varzim, where fishing activities occur. Alive or dead discarded fish while fishing can be easily caught by dolphins, which could help explain this relationship in the city's waters. The OMARE Marine Observatory also identified the Risso's dolphin and the Atlantic bottlenose dolphin in local waters. Stranded whales and dolphins and found dead occur with some frequency, natural causes, rough seas events, incidents with ships or fishing boats can explain these events.

The city core is situated in a region dominated by old Hercynian granites, including Póvoa de Varzim Granite and Santo André Granite. A continuous area dominated by schist exists to the Northeast and vernacular architecture of the rural areas highlight the local geological diversity. Oldest rocks, from the Pre-Ordovician epoch, are found in the Schist-greywacke Complex between Rates, Laundos, and Estela. Wandering even further Northeast, there is shale of micaceous clay nature, occasionally quartzite, dating to the Devonian period, that may contain fossils.

=== Climate ===
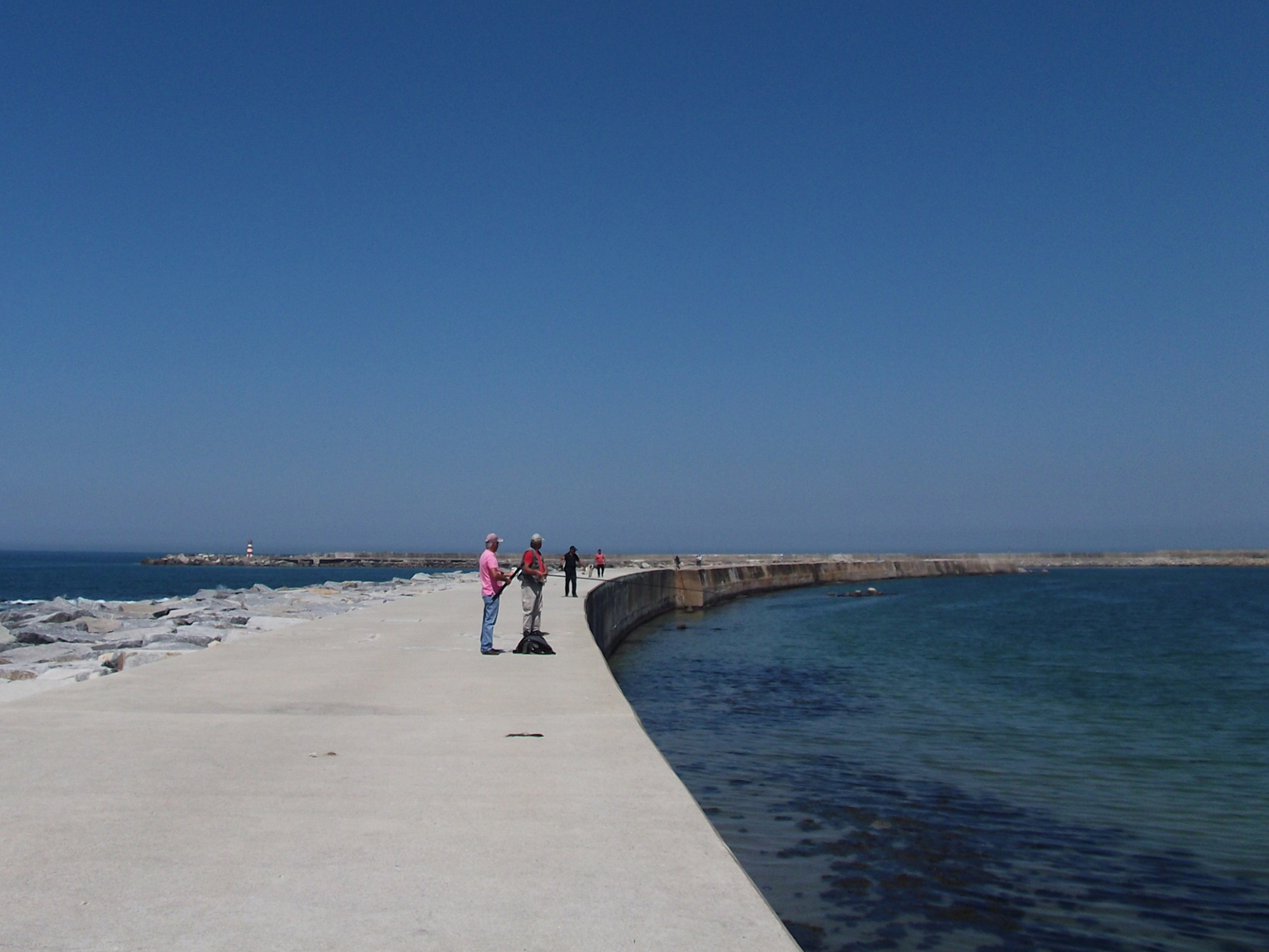
Port of Póvoa de Varzim breakwaters. Blue skies are common between April and September, with sunshine probability above 60%, peaking in the summer, nearing 80%. The rest of the year averages 50%.

Póvoa's climate is classified as a Warm-summer Mediterranean climate (Csb in the Köppen climate classification system), with gentle summers and mild winters, influenced by the Atlantic Ocean. Temperature extremes recorded at Sá Carneiro Airport, records started in 1967, range from −3.8 to 38.3 °C (25.2 to 100.9 °F). In Póvoa de Varzim proper, average temperatures oscillate between 9 °C (48.2 °F) in winter and 19 °C (66.2 °F) in the summer. The city's beach area averages between 11 and 18 °C (51.8 and 64.4 °F) and diurnal temperature variation there is very low, just 4 °C (39.2 °F). The remaining territory, including the northwestern rural beaches, swings around 8 °C (46.4 °F) daily. Using 1971–2000 data, there are 33 days a year above 25 °C (77.0 °F) and 9 days above 30 °C (86.0 °F). Heat waves can occur for an average of 10 days, yet it tends to be balmier than inland Northwestern Portugal, and it is used by inland Minho Province residents seeking to escape the summer heat in the valleys. The so-called tropical nights with minimum temperature above 20 °C (68 °F) occur three days per year.

There are no full-days below freezing, yet temperatures below 0 °C (32.0 °F) can occur at the height of winter during the night and early morning. The city possesses a microclimate and is considered the region least subject to frosts in all northern Portugal. Cold waves are absent and snowfall is firmly uncommon, the last occurred in January 1986. More recently, snowfall occurred inland. This is due to the winter maritime winds that normally blow from the south and southwest. Most of the rain is concentrated in the winter months, due to the Azores High which influences the subsidence of the air resulting in dry air during the summer. Topography and distance from the sea influence precipitation even at short distances. The urban core receives over 900 millimetres (35 in), the outskirts can get up to 1,200 millimetres (47 in) of rain per year, while the city's countryside can get up to 1,500 millimetres (59 in).

The prevailing northern winds, known as Nortadas, arise in the summer after midday. Strongest wind gusts are felt in the city's sands and only reaching inland in municipalities south of Póvoa de Varzim. During the summer, a mass of hot and wet air, brought by the south and western maritime winds, creates Póvoa de Varzim's characteristic fog covering only the coast and with strong ocean scent brought in by the marine layer, which is composed of salt from the surf and sea spray, with lesser amounts of iodine from the outlying kelp forests. Southerly winds can sporadically bring the Saharan Air Layer and Saharan dust can form a thick plume blocking the sun.

Sunshine duration values are high, between April and September the mean is always over 217 hours, peaking in July with 308 hours. The gloomiest months are December and January with 124 hours each (1961–1990 data). Solar irradiance is high in the city's beaches, and lower inland and on the northwestern coast.

== Demographics ==
Historical population
Year	Pop.	±%
1720	1,396	—
1736	1,796	+28.7%
1750	2,184	+21.6%
1768	3,360	+53.8%
1780	3,776	+12.4%
1795	4,328	+14.6%
1801	4,676	+8.0%
1821	5,672	+21.3%
1830	6,097	+7.5%
1836	8,036	+31.8%
1849	15,300	+90.4%
1864	18,704	+22.2%
1878	20,578	+10.0%
1890	23,372	+13.6%
1900	24,527	+4.9%
1911	25,083	+2.3%
1920	25,929	+3.4%
1930	28,780	+11.0%
1940	31,693	+10.1%
1950	37,938	+19.7%
1960	40,444	+6.6%
1970	42,698	+5.6%
1981	54,248	+27.1%
1991	54,788	+1.0%
2001	63,470	+15.8%
2011	63,408	−0.1%
2021	64,320	+1.4%
2025	72,364	+12.5%
Before 1849, data refers only to Póvoa de Varzim Parish (N.S. Conceição). 1720–1836 Sources: 1864–2001,

A native of Póvoa de Varzim is called a Poveiro which can be rendered into English as Povoan. According to the 2001 Census, there were 63,470 inhabitants that year, 38 848 (61.2%) of whom lived in the city. The number goes up to 100,000 if adjacent satellite areas are taken into account, ranking it as the seventh largest independent urban area in Portugal, within a polycentric agglomeration of about 3 million people, ranging from Braga to Porto. According to the EOCD methology, Póvoa de Varzim was the 13th largest Functional urban area of Portugal, hence a small urban area with 63,428 inhabitants, by including only its municipality. By 2025, with the population review, the municipality's population surpassed 70,000.

The urban area has a population density of 3,035 people/km^{2} (7,860 people/mi^{2}), while the rural and suburban areas have a density of 355.5/km^{2} (921/mi^{2}). The rural areas away from the city tend to be scarcely populated, becoming denser near it. During the summer the resident population in the city triples; this seasonal movement from neighbouring cities is due to the draw of the beach and 29.9% of homes had seasonal use in 2001, the highest in Greater Porto. Póvoa de Varzim is the youngest city in the region with a birth rate of 13.665 and mortality rate of 8.330. Unlike other urban areas of greater Porto, it is not a satellite city. Significant commuting occurs only with Vila do Conde, an urban expansion area of Póvoa since the 18th century.

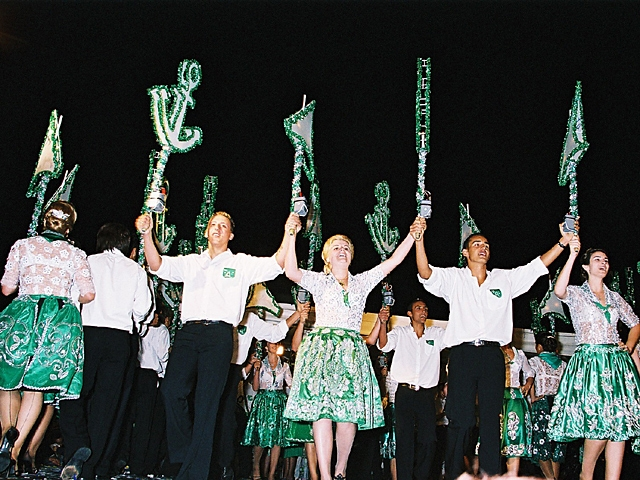
Poveiros during the 2006 Saint Peter festival.

For centuries a fishing community of mostly Norman origin, where ethnic isolationism was a common practice, Póvoa de Varzim is today a cosmopolitan town, with people originating from the Ave Valley who settled in the coastal Northern districts during the 20th century, the ancient immigration from Galicia, Portuguese-Africans (who arrived in significant numbers after the independence of Angola and Mozambique) in the late 1970s. In 2017, Póvoa de Varzim had a legal foreign resident population of 1.5%, up from 1.4% in 2008, mostly including economic migrants and expatriates, it excludes those who obtained Portuguese citizenship and illegal migrants. Most of these were from Brazil, China, Ukraine, France, Spain, Mozambique, Angola, Romania, the United Kingdom and Cape Verde. Most of the growth in foreign population arrived from China, other Asian countries, France and other European countries. In 2017, 231 migrants moved to Póvoa de Varzim from Brazil, Ukraine and Venezuela; but also from Uzbekistan, Angola, and Georgia. Indonesian fishermen have been contracted to work in Póvoa de Varzim to redress labour shortages. Their arrival was negotiated directly with the Indonesian diplomatic authorities. Their numbers have grown to over 400, though some have moved on to other areas and even other European countries.

The population of the entire municipality grew only 1% between 1981 and 1991, then increased by 15.3% between 1991 and 2001. During that period, the urban population had grown 23%, with the number of families increasing considerably — by about 44.5%. The urban area kept a slower but steady growth in the 21st century, and in the 2021 Census it was one of the few urban areas to expand in the whole of Portugal. The quality of living, the infrastructure development and a 15 minutes distance from Porto and Braga, prompted new residents originating from near-by cities such as Guimarães, Famalicão, Braga and Porto. The beach areas of Póvoa de Varzim is also popular for a new home by foreign nationals, mostly French and Swiss.

Due to the practice of endogamy and the caste system, Póvoa's fishing community maintained local ethnic characteristics. Anthropological and cultural data indicate Nordic fishermen settling during the period of the coast's resettlement. In As Praias de Portugal (Beaches of Portugal, 1876), Ramalho ortigão wrote that the Povoan fishermen were a "race" in the Portuguese coast; entirely different from the Mediterranean type of Ovar and Olhão, Poveiro is of "Saxon" type. On the other hand, the man from the interior was a farmer with Galician character (Paleo and Nordid-Atlantid). In a 1908 research, anthropologist Fonseca Cardoso considered that Poveiros were the result of a mixture of Teutons, Jews and mostly, Normans. In the book The Races of Europe (1938), Poveiros were distinguished by having a greater than usual degree of blondism, broad faces of unknown origin, and broad jaws.

Poveiros have migrated to other places and this attenuated the population growth. One should notice that the Poveiros tended to create their own associations abroad, there are Casa dos Poveiros (Poveiros House) in Brazil (Rio de Janeiro and São Paulo), Germiston in South Africa and Toronto in Canada. In Rio de Janeiro, the community was known for not wanting other peoples of other origins, including Portuguese born in other regions, within their community. In 1920, many Poveiros emigrated in Brazil returned, as many refused to lose Portuguese nationality. The governor of Angola, with an ambition to develop fisheries, suggested the creation of a Povoan colony in Porto Alexandre. Due to fisher classes affairs, the fisher areas of Vila do Conde, Esposende and Matosinhos have strong Povoan cultural influence and half of the population of Vila do Conde and Matosinhos are of Povoan descent.

== Economy ==
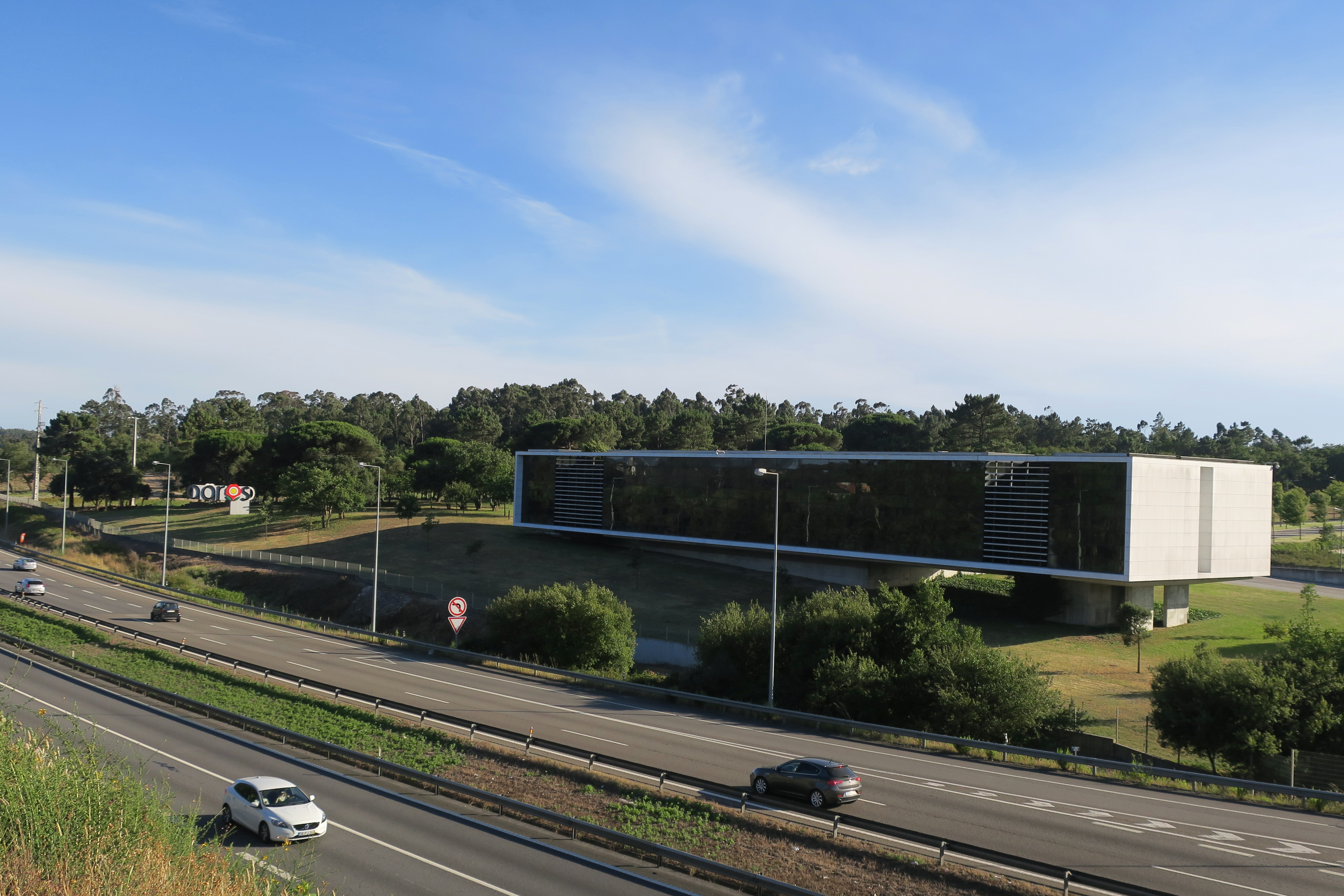
Agros headquarters in Espaço Agros business park.

The economy of Póvoa de Varzim is driven by sales, manufacturing, construction, healthcare, agribusiness, fishing, and tourism. In the 2021 census, the unemployment rate, at 8.3%, compared to Porto Metropolitan Area at 9.6%, Northern Portugal at 8.4% and the national average at 8.1%. Póvoa de Varzim's purchasing power represented 0.6% of the total national purchasing power in 2019, up from 0.5% in 1993. However, per capita values were just 96.5% of the national average in 2019, up from 90.6% in 1993.

Comparing 2009 to 2020, the diversified economy of Póvoa de Varzim drifted away from construction (-70.3%), administrative (-55.6%), Entertainment & leisure (-44.1%), and professional services (-22.9%) towards the growing fields of real estate (+73.5%), industrial sector (+47.3%), sales (+43.4%), Agribusiness & Fisheries (+41%), Healthcare (+31.9%) and Hospitality (+9.2%). quaternary sector (+41%) and Transport (+9.4%) are comparably minor yet growing economic activities.

Póvoa de Varzim's real estate development ranked as the fifth most active out of seventeen municipalities of Metropolitan Porto in 2015, when considering new homes. Reconstruction was mostly stagnant, and Póvoa de Varzim was eighth in overall activity.

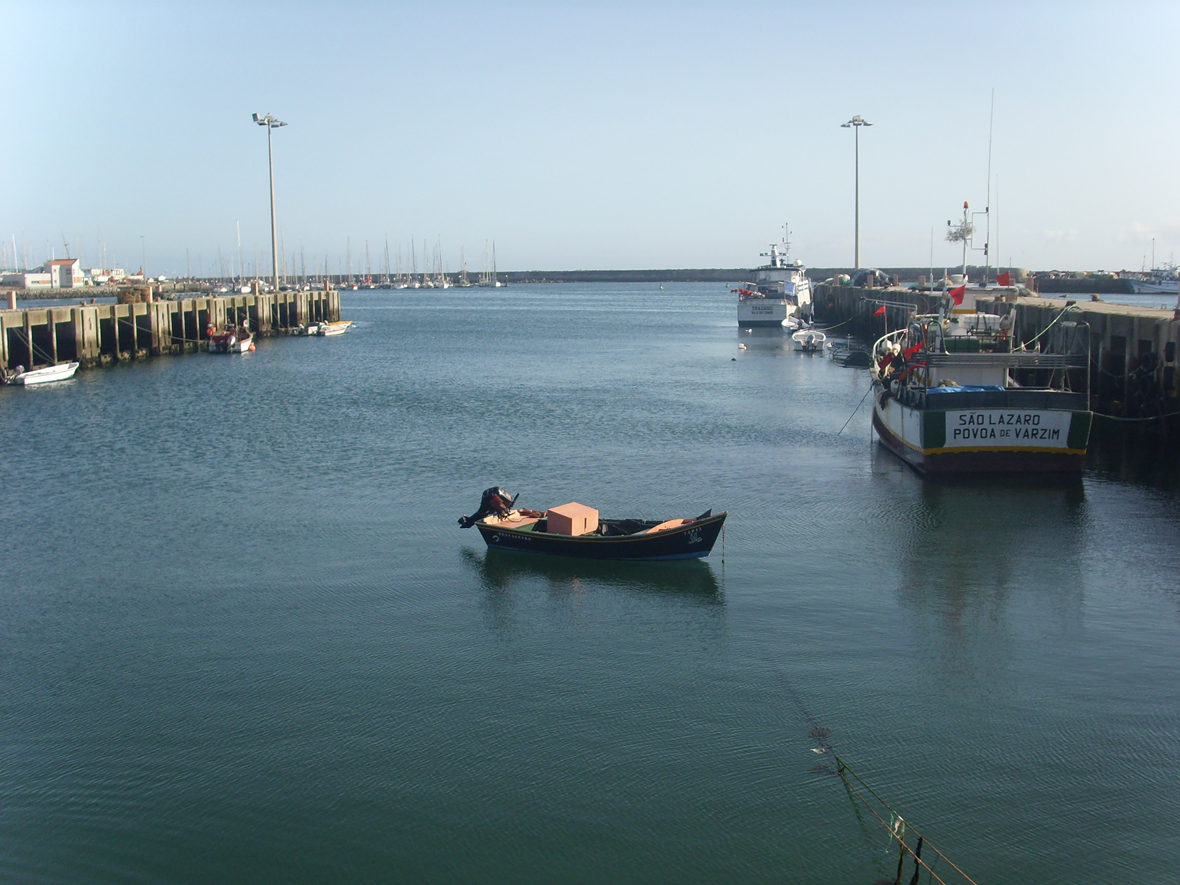
Póvoa de Varzim seaport.

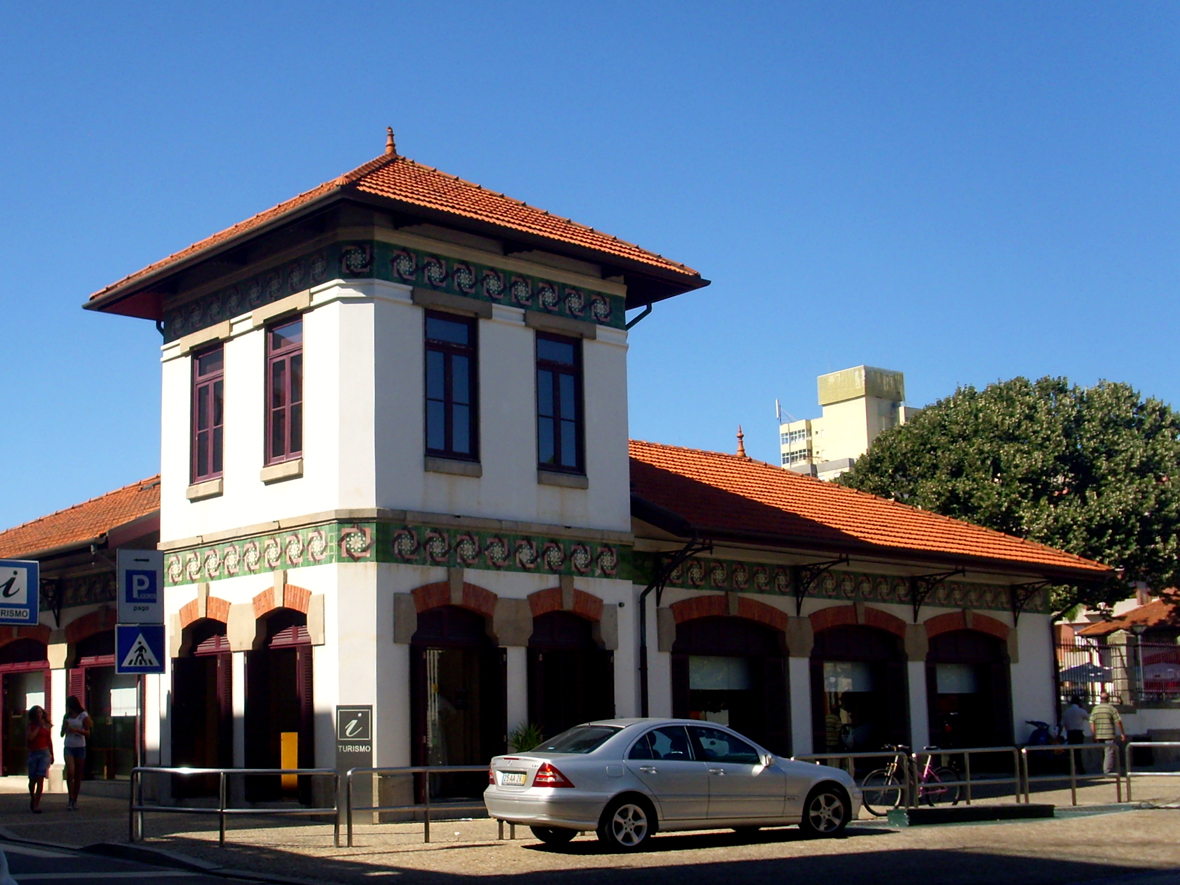
Tourism Post on one of the market towers of 1904.

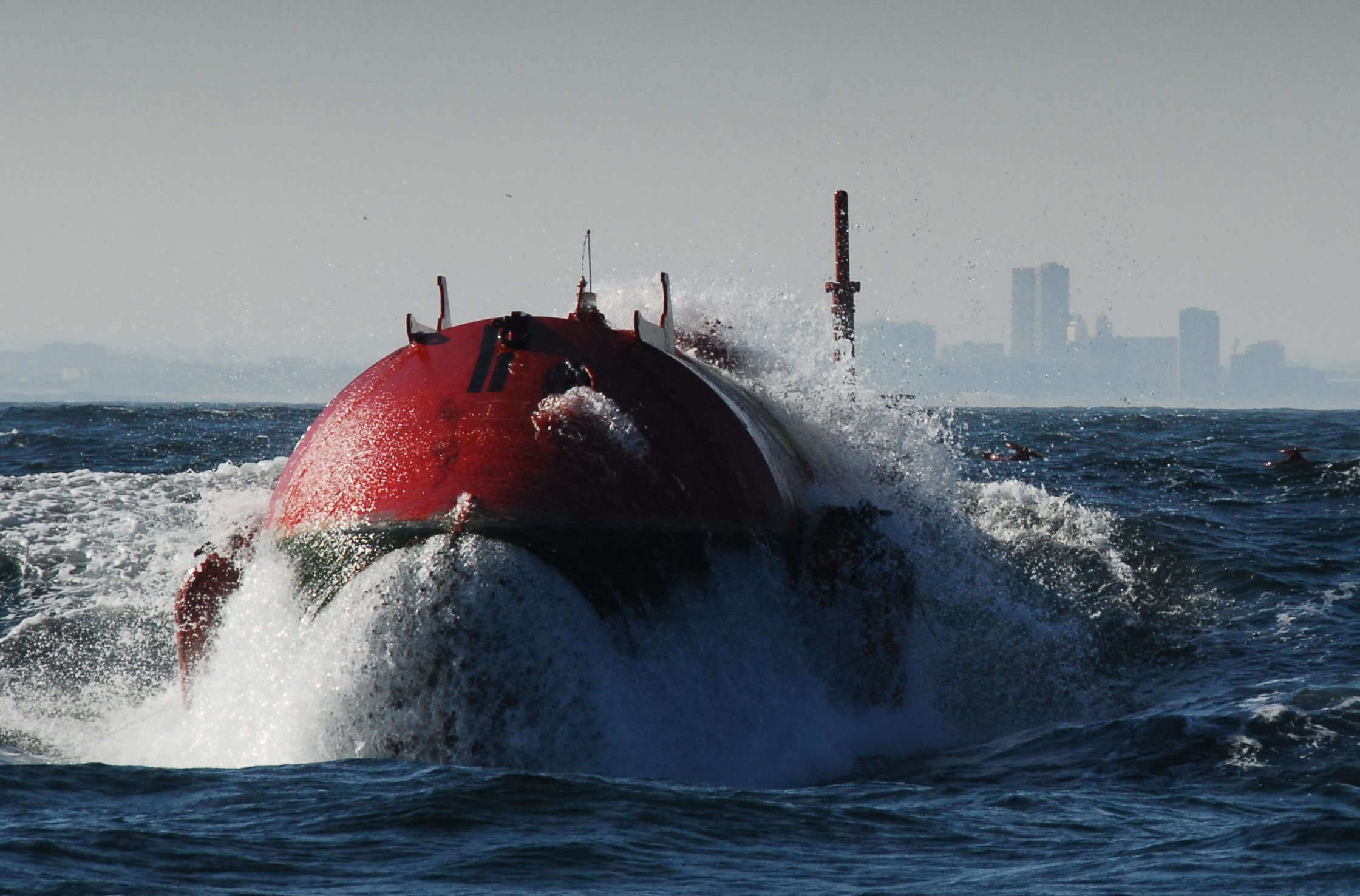
Some renewable energy research projects were tested in Póvoa de Varzim's coastline, including the Aguçadoura Wave Park (pictured) and the windfloat project.

=== Fisheries ===
The fact that it is a seaside city has shaped Póvoa de Varzim's economy: the fishing industry, from the fishing vessels that put in each day to the canning industry and to the city's fish market, beach agriculture, and seaweed-gathering for fertilizing fields are the result of its geography. Tourism and the related industries are more relevant in Póvoa's economy these days, as fisheries have lost importance. Nevertheless, the mean value of fish landed in 2004, in its seaport, was almost three times that of Matosinhos seaport and significantly higher in the average vessels' capacity. Its fishing productivity is also comparatively higher than the national average. A Poveira is a traditional Povoan canning factory and most of its production, 80 to 85%, is exported and deals with high-end brands in canned fish, for MDC markets. Export market brands include: Poveira, D'Henry IV, Ala-Arriba, Minerva, and Alva.

Marine fish farming started in 1994 by SafiEstela, an aquafarming firm established in 1968. It uses the latest knowledge on the breeding and production of seafood species, including soles, with fish husbandry. It was part of the European Maximus consortium of eight SME and 6 RTD performers involving states in Atlantic Europe, with scientific processes in a number of interrelated disciplines, including growth physiology, quality, fish welfare and stunning methods.

=== Agribusiness ===
Production is still specialized in horticultural goods, but most of the masseiras were substituted by greenhouses and a significant share of the production is exported to other Western European markets. Póvoa de Varzim is part of the ancient Vinho Verde winemaking region, and there is commercial wine production, however, local masseira wines are not commercially produced. The inland valley region is committed to milk production and the Agros corporation headquarters of Lactogal, the largest dairy products and milk producer company in the Iberian Peninsula, is located in Espaço Agros and has several departments such as exhibition park and laboratories. In agriculture, the masseira farm fields were developed. This technique increases agricultural yields by using large, rectangular depressions dug into sand dunes, with the spoil piled up into banks surrounding the depression. Grapes are cultivated on the banks to the south, east and west, and trees and reeds on the northern slope act as a windbreak against the prevailing northern wind. Garden crops are grown in the central depression.

=== Tourism ===
Tourism industry is subdivided into gambling, hospitality, restaurants, beach bars and cafés. National visitors are prevalent and from diverse localities. In 1876, Ramalho Ortigão noticed that Póvoa was very popular in all social ranks in Northern Portugal.

In the contemporary period, the construction of motorways negatively affected overnight stays in local hotels. This has been leveled by a noticeable attraction of Portuguese living abroad and foreign tourists and the number of hotel rooms in 2014 increased to 1.774. Most of those tourists are French or from diverse countries in Northern Europe. International tourists sleeping in the city's hotels represented 35.1% of guests in 2013, up from 30.3% in 2001. In 2017, international tourists represented 55% of guests in the hospitality industry, which registed 250 thousand overnight stays almost the double of the 2012 statistics. Informal local accommodation, especially typical homes in rua Latino Coelho, is a popular alternative. In the summer of 2017, Póvoa de Varzim was the second location with the largest growth in the Portuguese AirBNB hospitality service. Póvoa de Varzim has the longest overnight stays for foreign tourists in Metropolitan Porto who stay, on average, 3 days.

International awareness is increasing and Povoa de Varzim was considered a 2022 hotspot for family vacations in Portugal by Yahoo! UK and Prima magazine, along with Lisbon, Albufeira, Porto, Carvoeiro and Viana do Castelo, highlighting the seven miles of soft golden sands and the historical side of the city, namely the important fishing and shipbuilding legacy. National and foreign visitors search the town for the numerous sandy beaches, sunbathing, sunsets over the ocean, relaxation and city trips. Walking from the beach promenades to the old town shopping street, the Junqueira, is particularly enjoyed, as is local food, most especially seafood. Since 1970, Póvoa de Varzim became widely popular in Northern Portugal for restaurants specialized in Portuguese Piri Piri Chicken, Cabidela chicken blood rice or codfish. Due to tourism, affluent pensioners from the Western World living in Póvoa de Varzim increased, triggering fears of renewed gentrification, the city hall responded with the planned construction of apartments with controlled prices for young Povoans in Penalves area.

Reducing seasonality in tourism demand has been a city's goal, throw the development of sports and cultural tourism, this helped to decline the seasonality from 48.4% in 2001 to 44.9% in 2013.

=== Manufacturing ===
There are some industrial areas, including Zona Industrial de Amorim and Parque Industrial de Laundos, in the city's outskirts, next to the A28 Motorway. Póvoa de Varzim has been noted internationally for its Renewable energy industry. The world's first commercial wave farm was located in its coast, at the Aguçadora Wave Park. The wave farm used Pelamis P-750 machines. The project failed and was replaced by the windfloat project, a new prototype on offshore wind farms, from a distinct company, that attained successful testing. Energie, a company headquartered in Póvoa de Varzim, developed a thermodynamic solar system combining solar energy and a heat pump to generate energy.

The manufacturing industry is an important employer, mostly in the textile industry. One of its traditional and high-end products are the Tapetes Beiriz, a handmade rug produced since 1918, which currently also produces contemporary rugs. The clothing industry balanced back from European Union's expansion to Eastern Europe and Globalization, by shifting to luxury clothing for high fashion brands or reinventing uniforms, with specific needs or complexity, as seen in the case of Damel. In construction and civil engineering, Monte Adriano is a large Portuguese company.

== Government ==
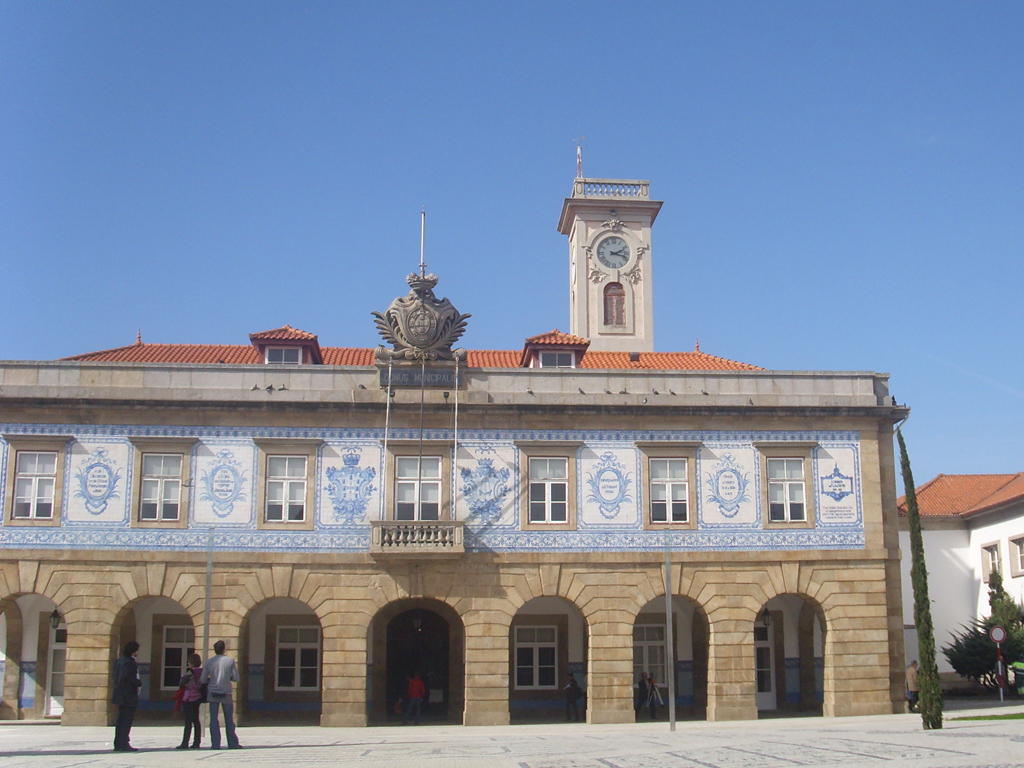
The City Council and assembly are lodged in a 1790 Neoclassical style building.

Civil parishes of Póvoa de Varzim
- Aguçadoura
- Argivai
- Amorim
- A Ver-o-Mar
- Balazar
- Beiriz
- Estela
- Laundos
- Navais
- Póvoa de Varzim
- Rates
- Terroso

Póvoa de Varzim is governed by a Câmara Municipal (City Council) composed of nine councilmen. A Municipal Assembly exists and it is the legislative body of the municipality.

After the first free elections, with the end of the Estado Novo period, only right-wing parties have governed the city: the city council was governed by the CDS between 1976 and 1989 and since then by the PSD. The CDS saw its popularity suffer an abrupt decline in 1997. On the other hand, the PSD in the same year achieved its first absolute majority with 62.4% of the votes. The current mayor is Andrea Silva, from the PSD, elected in 2025 with 40.6% of the votes, under a 58% turnout. The PSD holds a minority in the Municipal Assembly, but a majority in the administrative parishes. Póvoa de Varzim Assembly is singly elected and comprises 27 members, with the PSD holding 11 seats — 36.84%, the PS 9 seats — 29.15%, Chega 5 seats — 17.85%, the Liberals 1 seat — 5.26%, and the CDS 1 seat — 3.78%.

Póvoa de Varzim is the northernmost municipality in the Porto Metropolitan Area, about 27 km (17 mi) north of Porto. However, it is not a Porto's Commuter town. Póvoa de Varzim also used to be part of the former Association of Municipalities of the Ave Valley, along with neighbouring cities such as Vila do Conde, Guimarães, and Famalicão, with which it has the most important modern demographic links.

Since the establishment of the County of Portugal around 1095, Varzim was an administrative and military unit that stretched from the sea to Cividade de Terroso and São Félix Hills. Póvoa de Varzim was established as a municipality in 1308 with the election of a town hall judge and boundary exemption. As the town achieved broad self-government in the 16th century, restricted borders were created, which split the town itself and since disputed by the town hall. Over time, these were expanded to approach the medieval lordship boundaries. However, Caxinas and Poça da Barca, south expansion areas of Póvoa de Varzim in the 18th and 19th centuries with fisher populations from Póvoa, are administrated by Vila do Conde, in spite of the centuries-old requests of Póvoa de Varzim for these to be incorporated in its municipality. Inland, the parishes of Rio Mau, Touginhó, and Arcos are also historically disputed.

The origin of the coat of arms of Póvoa de Varzim is unknown, but it certainly has local traits and symbolism. The coat of arms consists of a golden sun and a silver moon; in the middle a golden cross completed by two anchor silver arms, representing safety at sea. Over the cross, a ring, of which falls a golden rosary that interlaces with the anchor arms, representing faith and divine protection. The crest is made of five silver towers due to its city status. The flag is broken in blue and white. Between 1939 and 1958, a different coat of Arms and flag were used, which the population criticized; it consisted of a golden shield, covered by a red net, the sea and a black Poveiro boat; the flag was plain red. The population did not accept these new symbols and years later the old ones would be restored.

== Cityscape ==
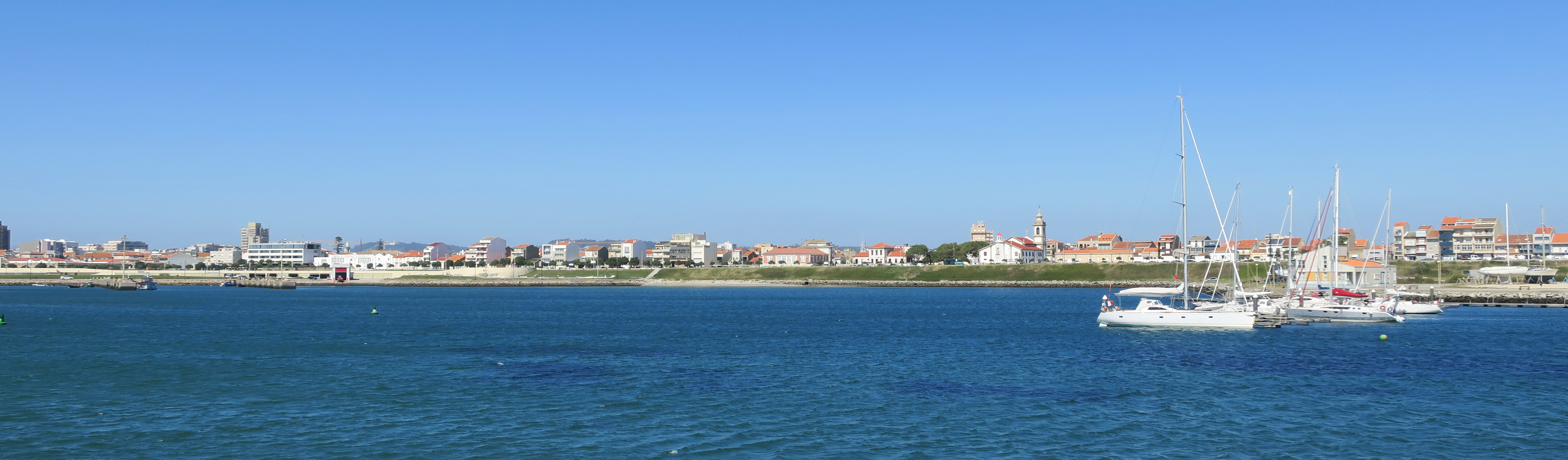
Bairro Sul skyline. Located around Póvoa Cove, the district started developing in the 18th century.

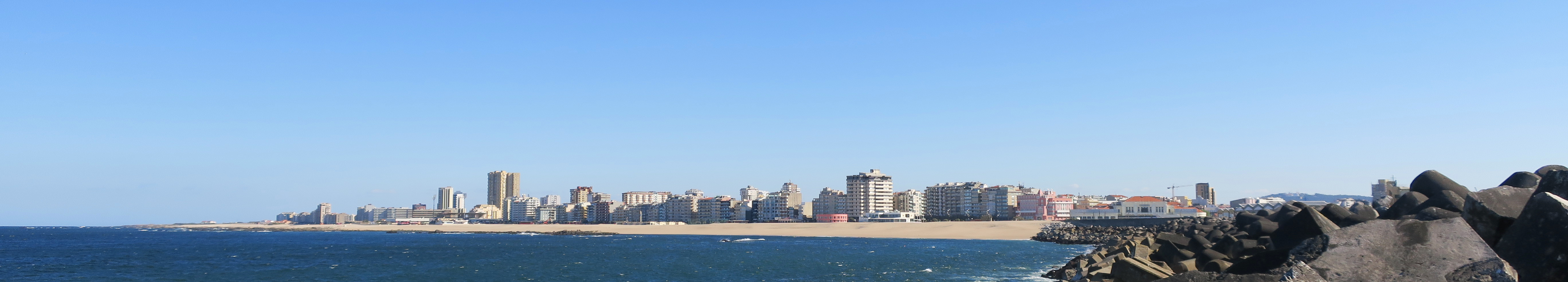
Bairro Norte central beachfront, the district started developing in the 19th century.

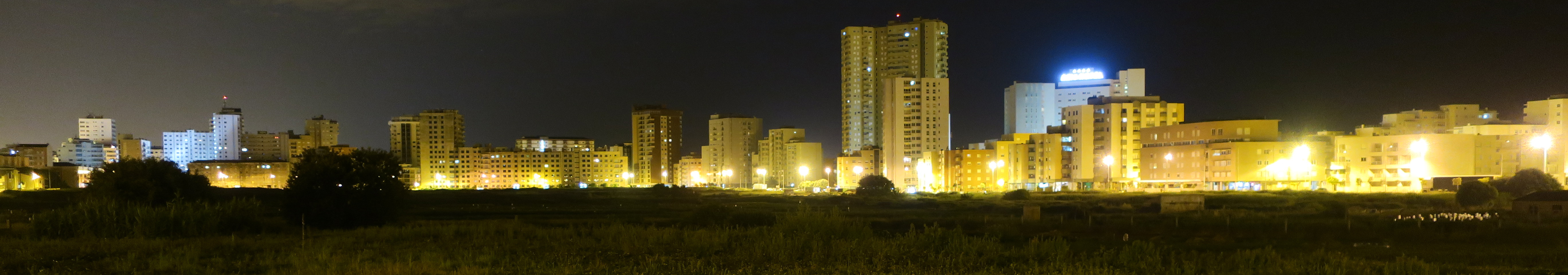
Nova Póvoa night view. Also known as Agro-Velho, its verticalization occurred mostly in the 1970s and 1980s.

=== Urban morphology ===
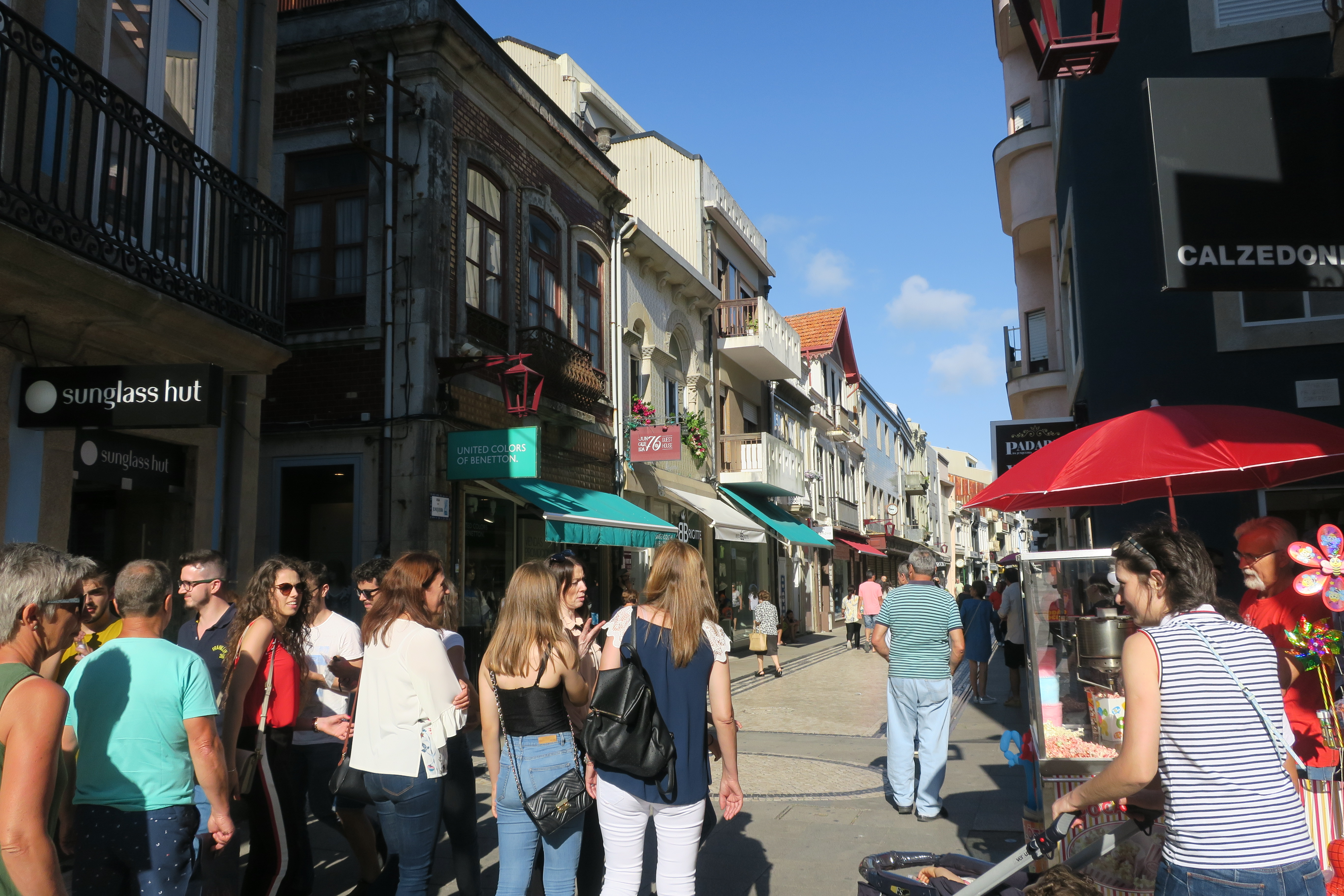
The Junqueira shopping street.

Located in the coastal plain between the sea and hills, the city of Póvoa de Varzim has eleven Partes (parts), or districts. These districts are, in turn, part of two formal administrative structures known as freguesias (civil parishes): U.F. Póvoa de Varzim, Beiriz e Argivai and U.F. Aver-o-Mar, Amorim e Terroso. To the south, the city is extending out to combine with Vila do Conde.

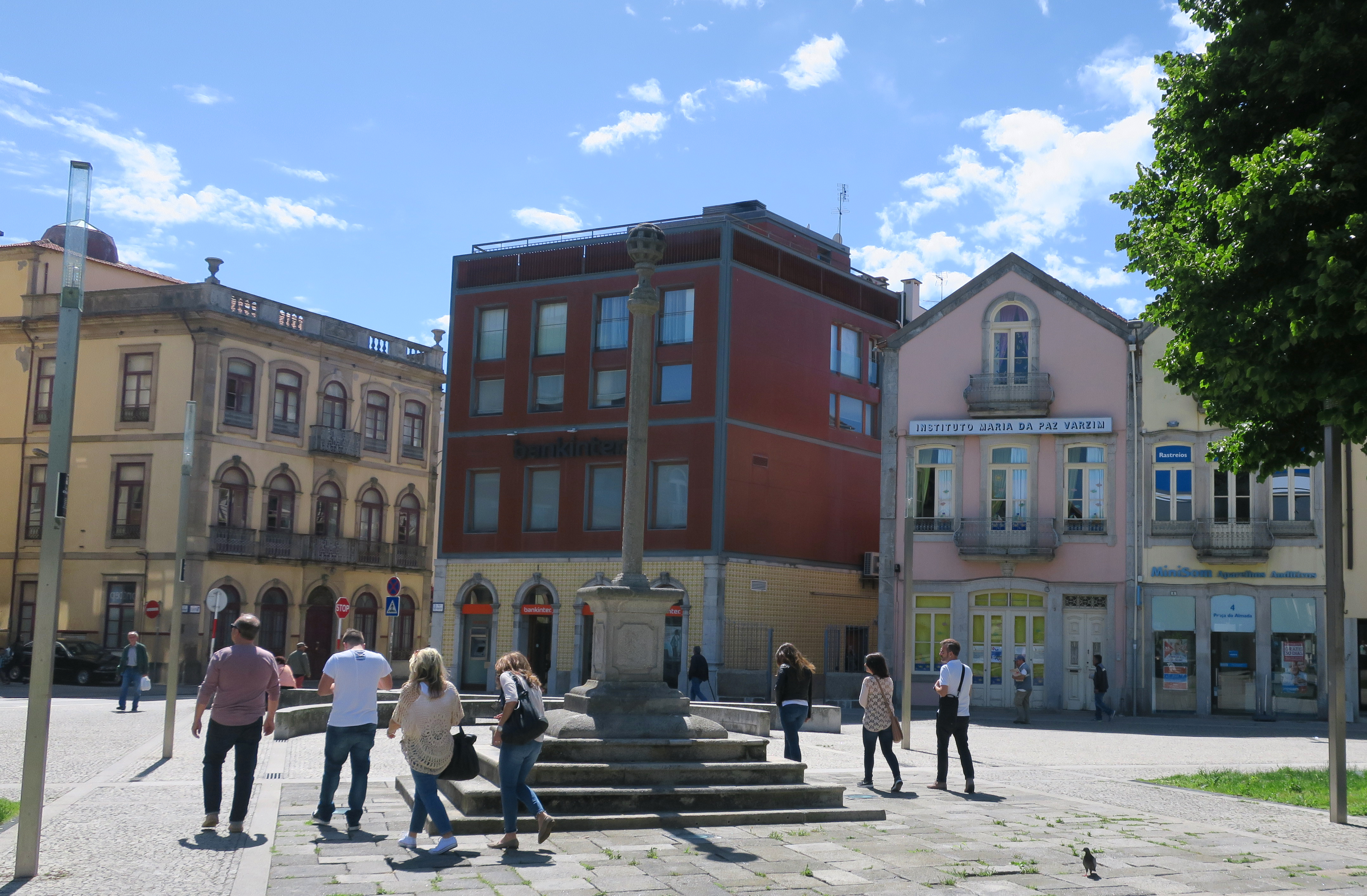
Pelourinho in Praça do Almada.

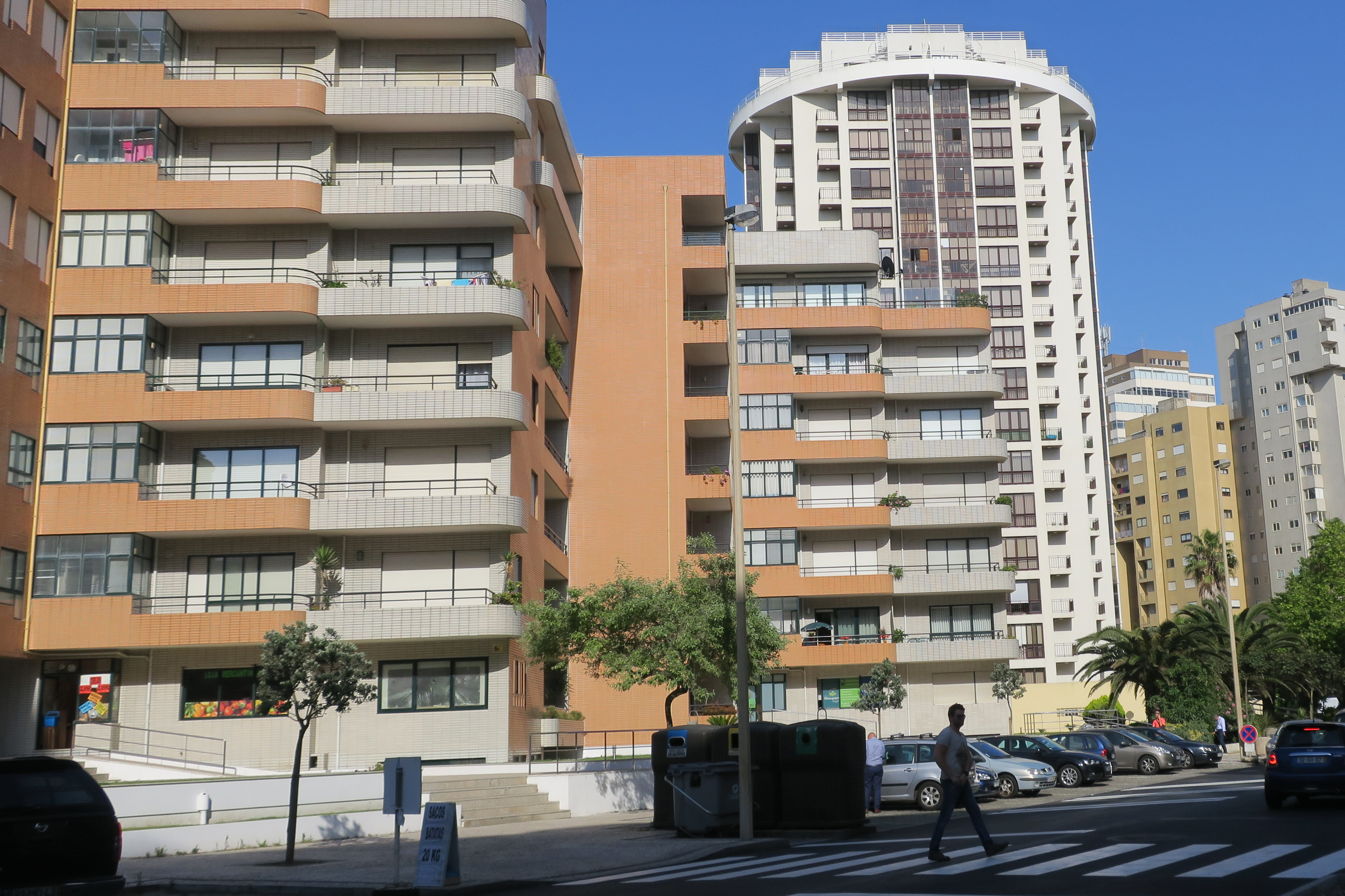
Urban density in Nova Póvoa. It overtook other traditional areas, and became one of the city's main tourist and services hub.

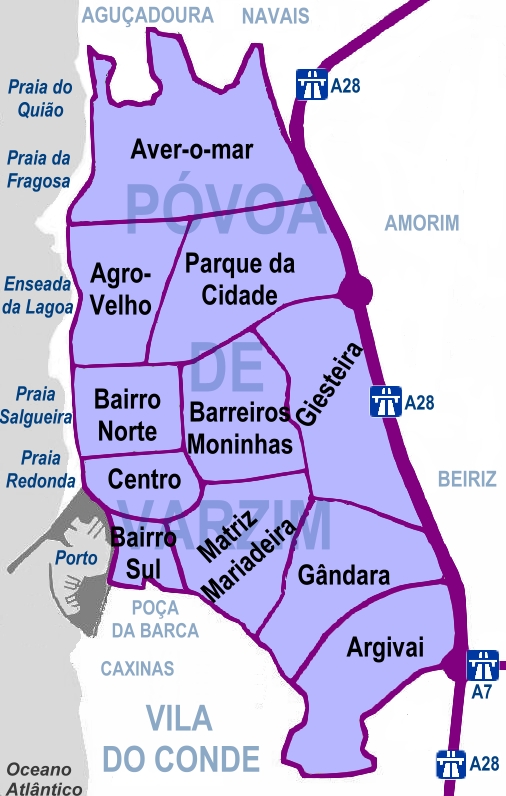
The city proper is located over a total area of 12.8 km^{2} (4.9 sq mi). It is not an administrative area, but an urbanization and greenbelt policy.

The city started from an inland town that extended to the coast. The Bairro da Matriz, whose nucleus was the centre from whence the city grew, is intersected by 14th century narrow and twisted streets lined by single-family homes. The historical district has old buildings such as the sixteenth-century house in front of Matriz Church — the main church, the old Town Hall (14th century), the seventeenth-century Solar dos Carneiros and the house of Captain Leite Ferreira, and the eighteenth century Limas and the Coentrão Houses. The fishermen were grouped in the south coast, around Póvoa Cove (Enseada da Póvoa); The fisher district was already developed in the 18th century with its structure of narrow streets parallel to the coast.

Póvoa de Varzim City Centre or Centro is dominated by the service sector and by the shopping streets of Junqueira and Mousinho de Albuquerque Avenue. Praça do Almada, the central square, is tipped by City Hall, municipal departments, banks and other services. In the middle of the square, to the west, the Manueline pillory of Póvoa de Varzim stands. The Pelourinho, granted to the town in 1514, is a national monument representing the municipal emancipation of Póvoa de Varzim.

Bairro Norte, the beach district, is north of town and is densely occupied. Continuous to this area, the Agro-Velho beach district, mostly known as Nova Póvoa, is the area of the city with most high-rises, the largest of which the Nova Póvoa, with 30 floors and 95 metres (312 ft) high, complete in 1979, was the tallest building in Portugal until the year 2000 and is still today one of the five tallest buildings. Close at hand, Barreiros and Parque da Cidade are districts from the latest expansion.

Inland, Giesteira, derived from the old village of Giesteira that, with Argivai, formed the main nucleus of the settlement before the 14th century, and whose lavradores (farmers) set up "Póvoa" in the coast. Argivai is divided by the Santa Clara Aqueduct, the second-largest aqueduct in Portugal, construction started in 1626. The old areas of Mariadeira, Regufe, Penalves, and Gândara have modest development, possess different topologies and are residential with small central areas. The Regufe Quarter has as symbol the Regufe Lighthouse, a sample from the 19th century iron art. Aver-o-mar is the northernmost urban coastal district and also of residential nature, with the exception of Santo André also known as Quião, which keeps an untouched fishing character recognized by family homes that have grown up in a spontaneous way.

Of the diverse religious buildings the 18th-century Baroque churches are prominent: the Parish Church, the Church of Our Lady of Sorrows and its six chapels, and the fishermen Lapa Church, with its curious Lapa Lighthouse. On the other hand, Misericórdia Church and the Basilica of the Sacred Heart of Jesus denote the preference for the Neoclassical style at the end of the 19th century. The Romanesque revival style can be seen in São José de Ribamar.

=== Beaches and parks ===
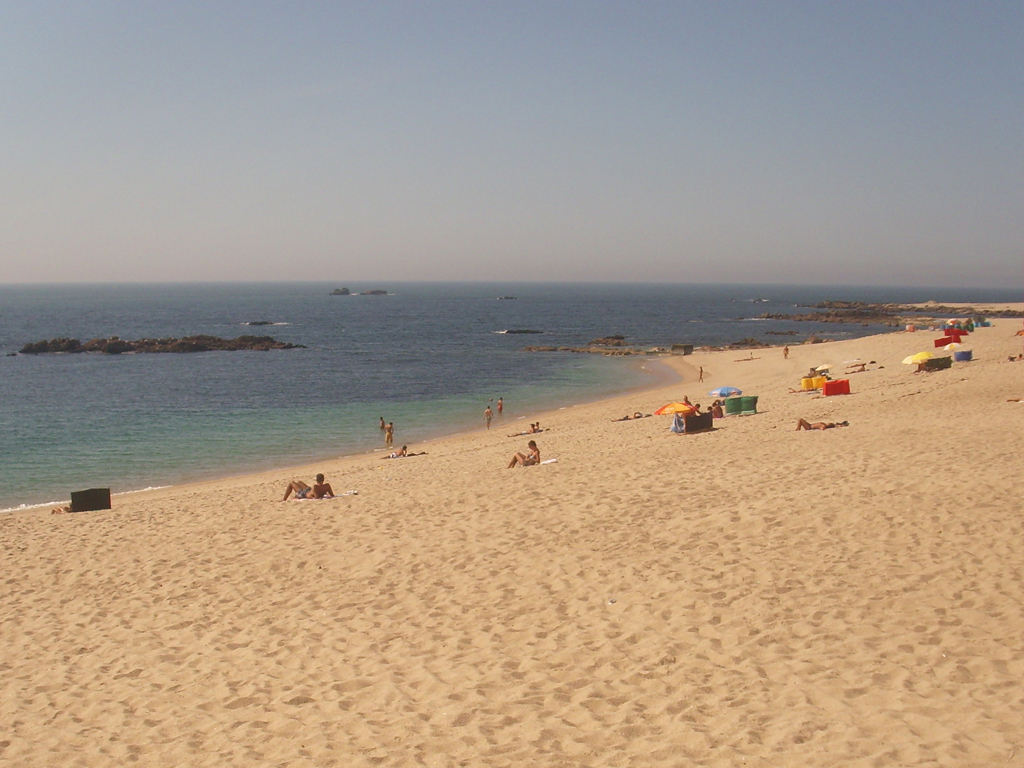
Lagoa beach.

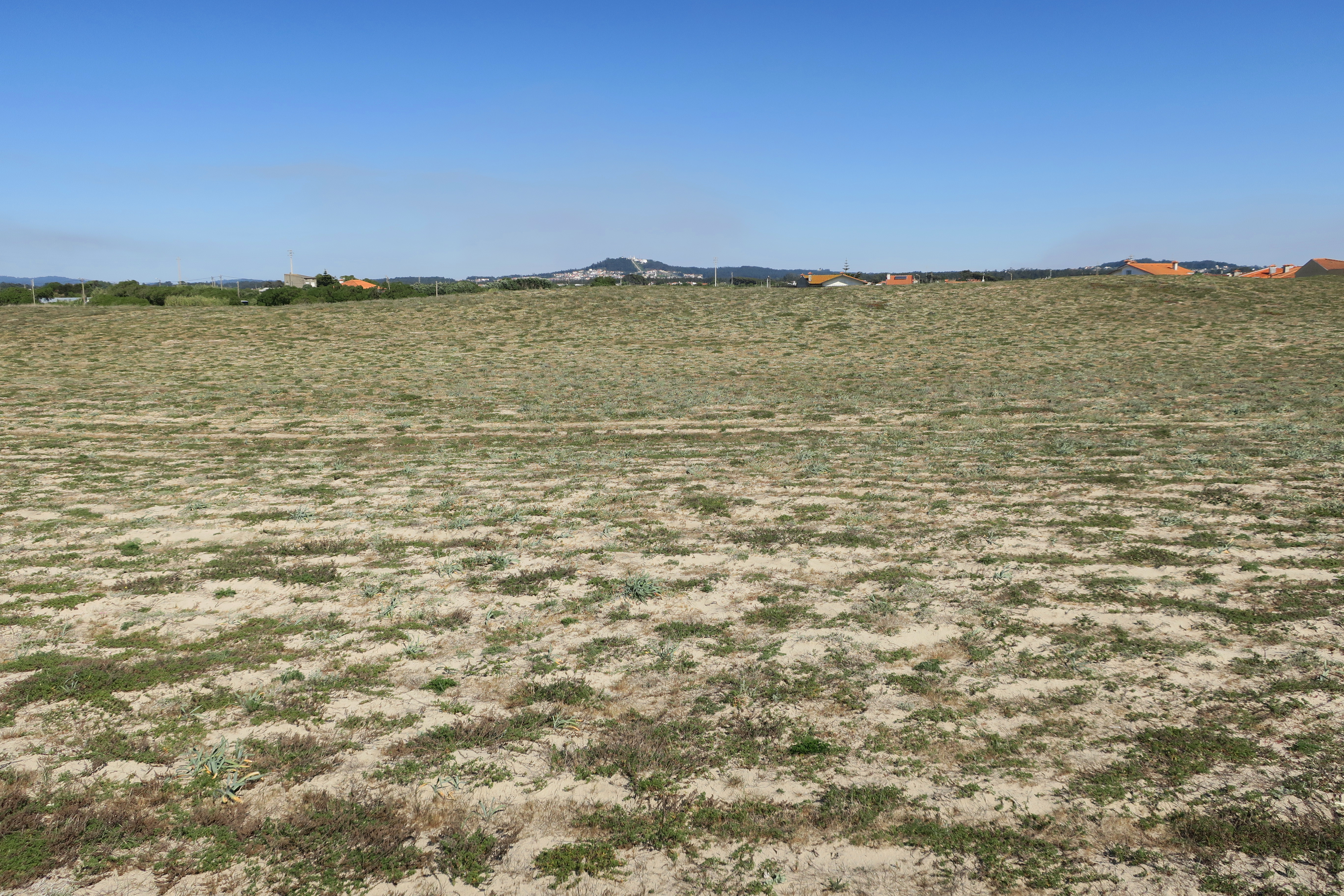
The grey dune with a predominance of camephytes. São Félix Hill in the background.

Póvoa de Varzim's beach is a 12 km (7.5 mi) stretch of golden sands, forming sheltered bays and divided by rocks. Most beaches in the city are family-oriented such as Redonda, Salgueira or Lagoa Beach and during the summer period it can get crowded while those away from the city core, such as Santo André, are less crowded. Salgueira and Aguçadoura are surfing beaches. Located near a camping park, Rio Alto Beach is chosen by naturists given its difficult access and the privacy offered by the sand dunes.

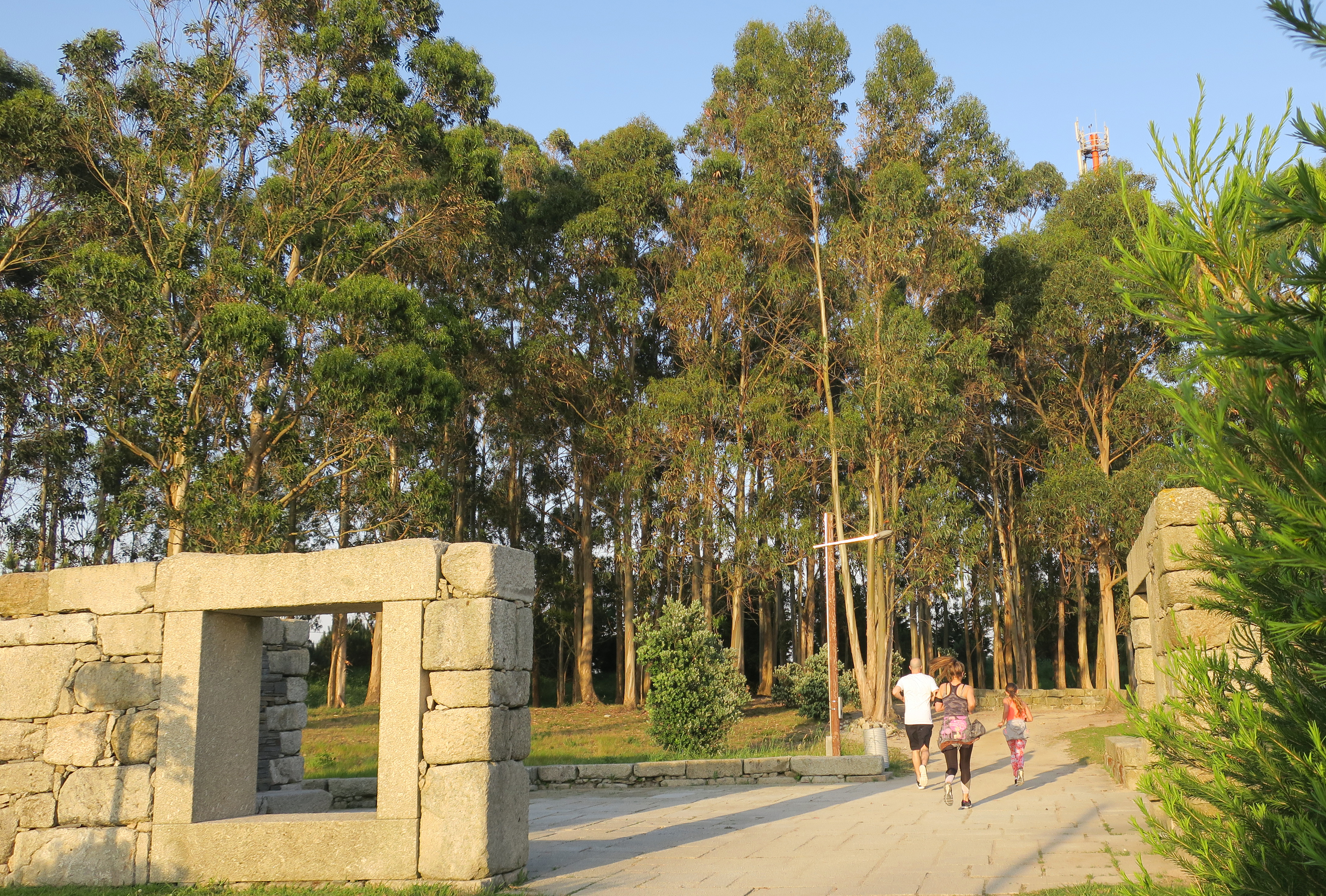
Póvoa de Varzim City Park.

The most important and popular green space is Póvoa de Varzim City Park, an urban park hosting leisure activities. It is almost entirely landscaped including hills, a large island, a lake, ponds and a stream. The city park and other minor parks in Póvoa de Varzim were designed by Sidónio Pardal, a well-known Portuguese landscape architect. It also includes great lawn areas, rustic buildings, amphitheatres and playground structures. It is a popular place for jogging, cycling and birdwatching. It stretches from the A28 motorway to Pedreira Lake.

Póvoa de Varzim's most relevant garden squares are Praça do Almada (19th century) and Praça Luiz de Camões (20th century). Near the A28 motorway, there are three small parks: Espaço Agros, Argivai Picnic Park (Parque de Merendas de Argivai), and Travessa de Calves Green Space. Espaço Agros is a private-sponsored park with 22 hectare in the former Anjo woodland. This woodland was damaged by the construction of high speed roads in the beginning of the 1990s. Agros kept the essential rural setting, with some landscaping and environmental improvements, including a small lake. This is also the location of the city-owned Picnic Park, used for Easter Monday picnics.

The Primary Dune System of Póvoa de Varzim, on the Northwestern coast, stretches for more than 6 km (3.7 mi). Best preserved in Northern Aguçadoura's Dune Park where a boardwalk exists between the primary dune and the grey dune. Boardwalks exist in considerable lengths of the coastline. The Port of Póvoa de Varzim is a semi-natural open space, popular in the weekend or the summer months. Cividade de Terroso is an archeological site surrounded by lush green areas and, on the hilltop, exclusively with native flora, as proven by archeological research. São Félix Hill (Monte São Félix), with panoramic views over the city and the countryside, is a religious and forested hill with a gardened stairway. The outer suburbs include Parque da Estela and Rates Park. The later is an adventure-camp with sport activities, canopy walkways, ecotourism by foot, horse, all-terrain vehicles or mountain biking.

=== Countryside ===
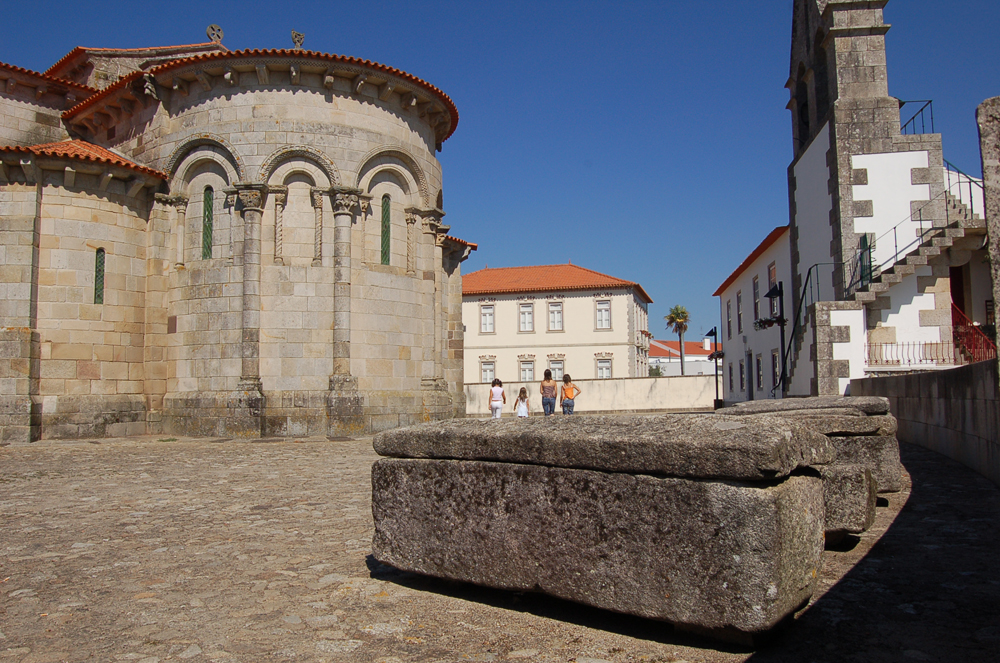
The Monastery of Rates was established in 1100 AD, but there are traces in the church that date back to the Roman Empire.

The green belt of Póvoa de Varzim includes a web of 98 localities in the parishes of Aguçadoura, Amorim, Balazar, Beiriz, Estela, Laundos, Navais, Rates, and Terroso. São Pedro de Rates, Codixeira, Aldeia, Pedreira, Fontainhas, Areosa, Teso, and Santo André de Baixo are the main rural communities, but there are tiny villages, such as Além, Calves, Gestrins, Gresufes, Passô, Sejães, and Crasto.

Terroso, Amorim and Beiriz are located in the urban hinterland. Beiriz has the notorious Beiriz carpets and diverse old country estates such as villas and a tapada, a hunting park, while Amorim is known for the bread eaten at high temperatures just after being made — the Broa de Amorim. The hills of Póvoa de Varzim: Cividade and São Félix are located in Terroso and Laúndos, respectively. On the first hill, there is Cividade de Terroso, with 3 thousand years was one of the major Castro culture cities, and the eremite Saint Félix is thought to have lived on the second hill during the Middle Ages.

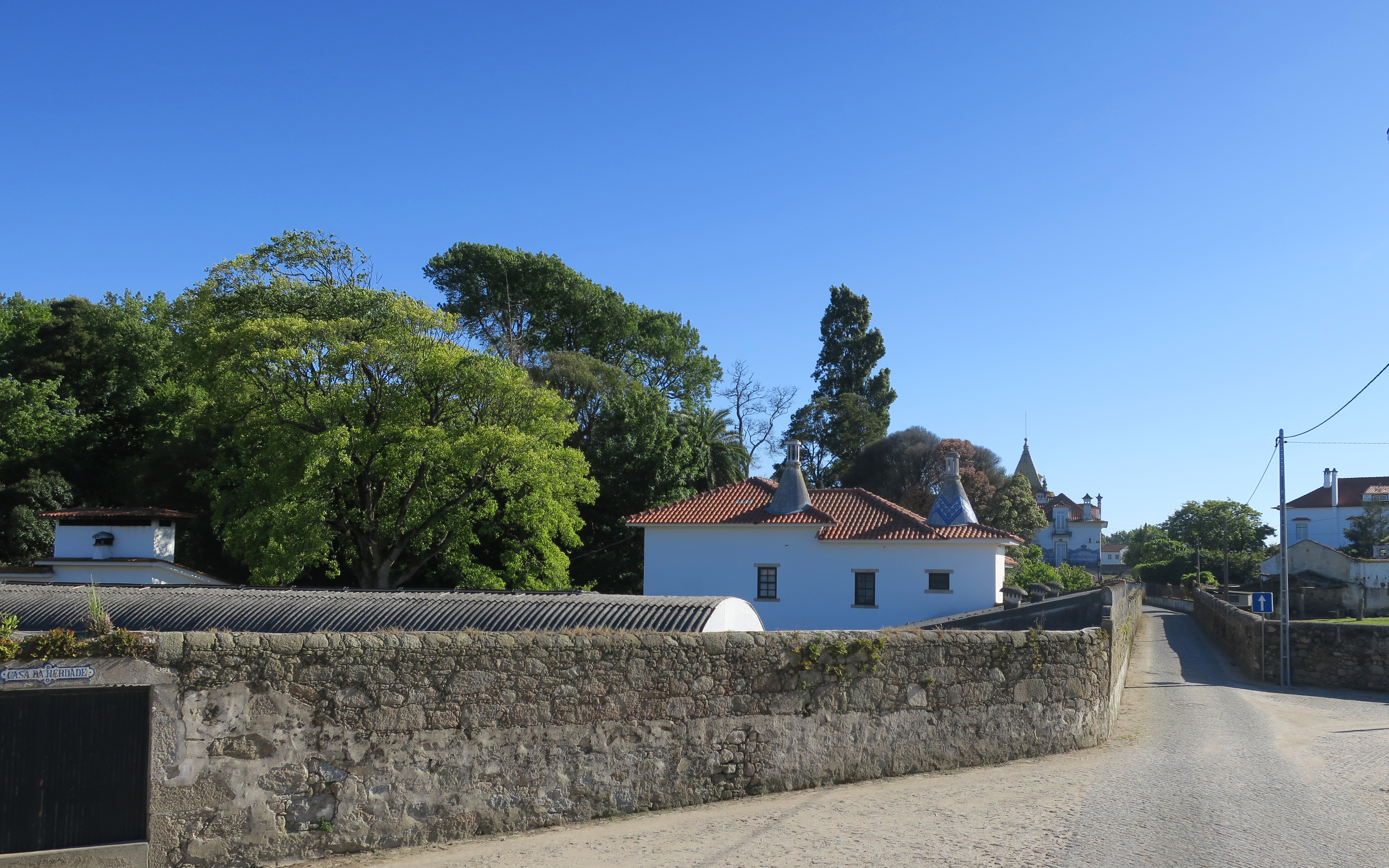
Calves is a bucolic area in the rural–urban fringe.

Rates was a small town during the Middle Ages which developed around the monastery established by Count Henry in 1100 on the site of an older temple and gained importance due to the legend of Saint Peter of Rates, the first bishop of Braga, becoming a central site in the Portuguese way of Saint James. Of the millenarian monastery, the São Pedro de Rates Church remains and is one of the oldest and best preserved Romanesque monuments in Portugal and is classified as national monument since 1910. Bordering Rates, Balazar became a Christian pilgrimage destination in the 20th century due to Alexandrina Maria da Costa, died 1955, who gained fame as a Saint, beatified by Pope John Paul II.

The northern sandy land of the municipality, Aguçadoura, Navais, and Estela is the farming area of Póvoa de Varzim, supplying the European markets with horticultural goods. In old times, the population attributed legends, magical virtues or therapeutic effects to several springs. In Navais, there is the very ancient Moura Encontada Fountain, associated with Moura — a feminine water deity and guardian of enchanted treasures.

== Culture and contemporary life ==
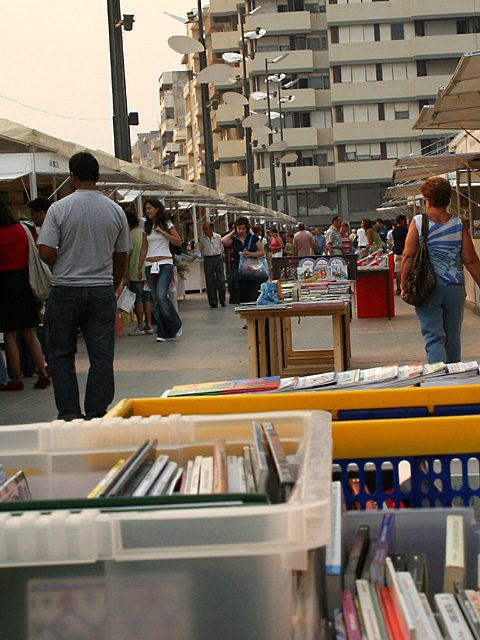
The Póvoa de Varzim Book Fair takes place in August in Passeio Alegre.

Junqueira is Póvoa de Varzim's busiest shopping district, that cater to both the daily needs of residents and visitors. The main street, a shopping street since the 18th century, is a pedestrian area since 1955, one of the earliest in Portugal, and a model for other Portuguese cities that later did similar developments. It has about 1 km (0.62 mi) of pedestrian streets. Dotted with boutiques in old traditional buildings, Junqueira is renowned for its jewellery, with Ourivesaria Gomes was the goldsmith, The most notable of its goldsmiths is Ourivesaria Gomes, where, during the Estado Novo, important people of the regime were often seen with their families. Open for more than 100 years, Ourivesaria Gomes was the goldsmithery of the Portuguese Royal House, and it had kings, nobility and the clergy as customers. The bullet used for the assassination attempt of Pope John Paul II was encrusted in the crown of Our Lady of Fatima by them.

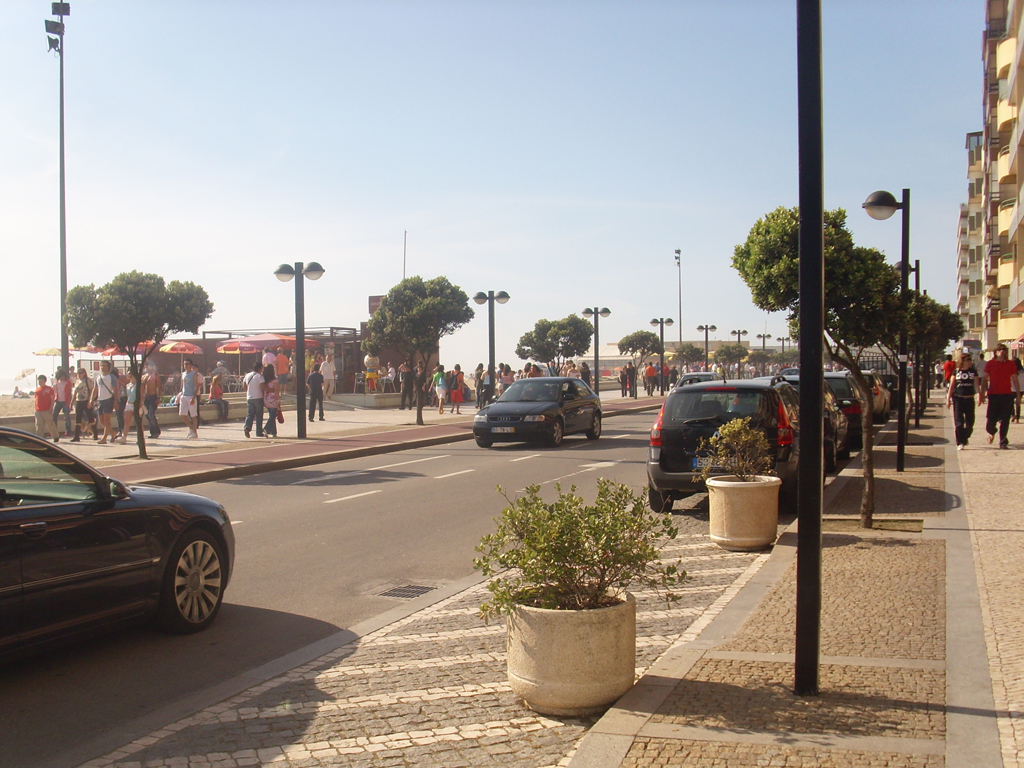
Avenida dos Banhos runs along the main city beaches.

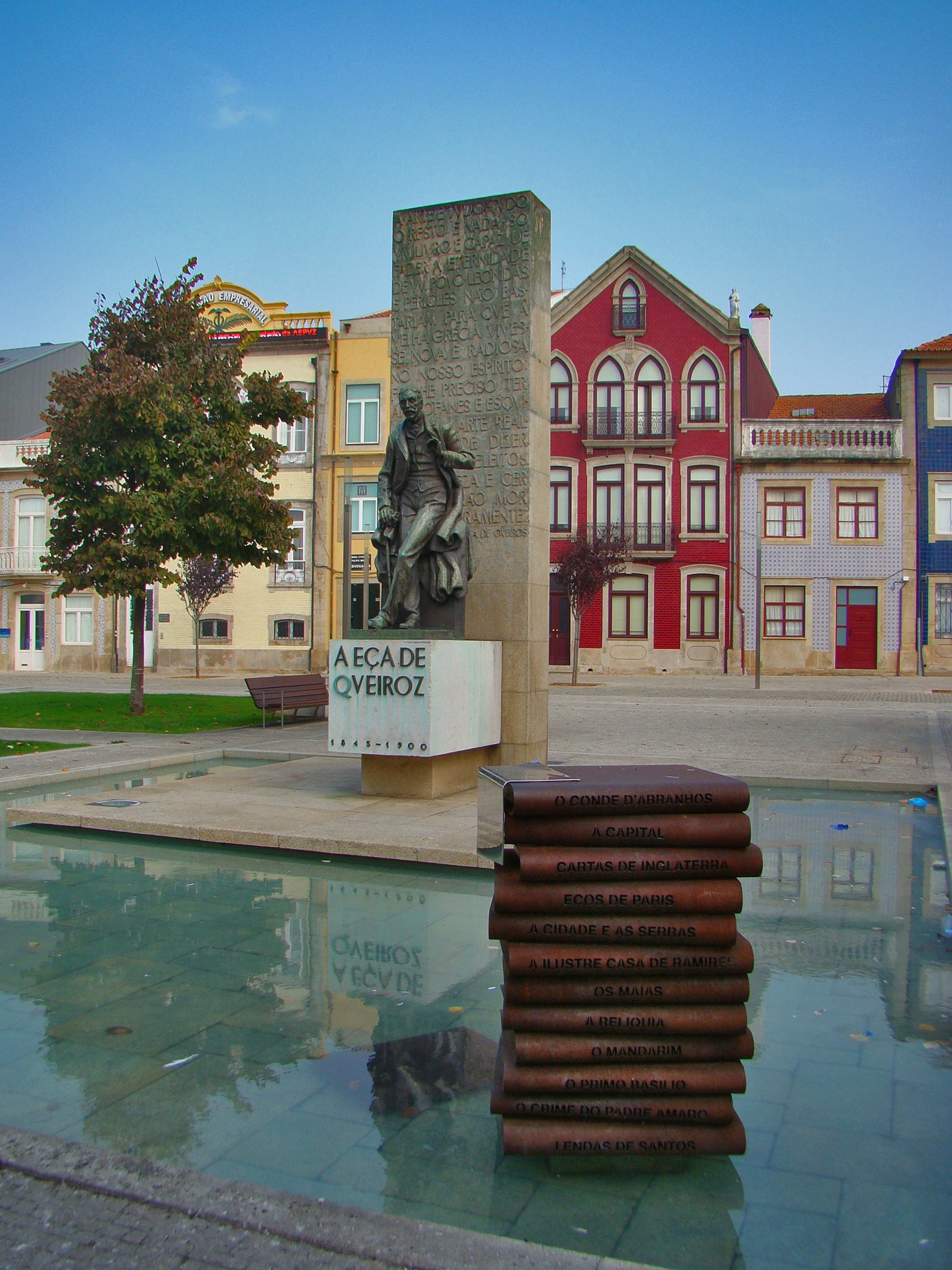
Statue of Eça de Queiroz in Praça do Almada."I'm a poor man from Póvoa de Varzim" is one of Eça's most famous autobiographical phrases.

People in Póvoa de Varzim observe a variety of festivals each year. The major celebration is Póvoa de Varzim Holiday, dedicated to Saint Peter. Neighbourhoods are decorated and, on the night of 28 to 29 June, the population gathers in the streets and neighbourhoods compete in the rusgas carnival. The population behaves much like football supporters, when defending their preferred quarter. Families who emigrated to the United States and beyond, have been known to come back to Póvoa, time and again, simply to relish the spectacular feelings of excitement and community present at this festival. Easter Monday or Anjo festival is a remnant of a pagan festival, formerly called "Festa da Hera" (The Ivy Festival), in which several family picnics are held in the woods.

Carnival is a traditional festival in Póvoa de Varzim with the old Carnival Balls, masked people gathering in Rua da Junqueira until the late 1970s which led to the 1980s expensive carnival parades in the waterfront. The remains of such organized events are now celebrated spontaneously by the people who gather for a parade in Avenida dos Banhos. Despite not having any sort of advertising or media coverage, Póvoa's "Spontaneous Carnival" (Carnaval dos espontâneos) started to attract thousands of people.

Póvoa de Varzim's waterfront is a beach and nightlife area popular with tourists and locals alike. Avenida dos Banhos, along Redonda and Salgueira beaches, is an iconic venue, with nightclubs, bars, and esplanades along the way. Passeio Alegre is a beach square filled with esplanades and nearby Caetano de Oliveira Square, to the north, is a small lively square, with several bars where younger Povoans meet, before going on to the nightclubs. Póvoa has an LGBT-friendly history since the late 1990s and held the Northern Portugal Pride, the first city in the North to hold a gay pride festival, which ended in 2005, due to climbing rental prices. It was organized by former Hit Club and ILGA Portugal.

Póvoa de Varzim has been a writers Mecca since the 19th century, gathering in tertulia sessions. Famous writers closely associated with the city are Almeida Garrett, António da Costa, Ramalho Ortigão, João Penha, Oliveira Martins, António Nobre, Antero de Figueiredo, Raul Brandão, Teixeira de Pascoaes, Alexandre Pinheiro Torres, and Agustina Bessa-Luís. However, the city is mostly remembered as the birthplace of Eça de Queiroz, one of the main writers in the Portuguese language. Camilo Castelo Branco wrote part of his life's work in former Hotel Luso-Brazileiro and José Régio wrote most of his work in Diana Bar, currently the beach library.

In modern times, the city gained international prominence with Correntes d'Escritas, a literary festival where writers from the Portuguese and Spanish-speaking world gather in a variety of presentations and an annual award for best new release. Latin American writer Luis Sepúlveda or the Africans Mia Couto and Ondjaki became associated with the city.

=== Entertainment and performing arts ===
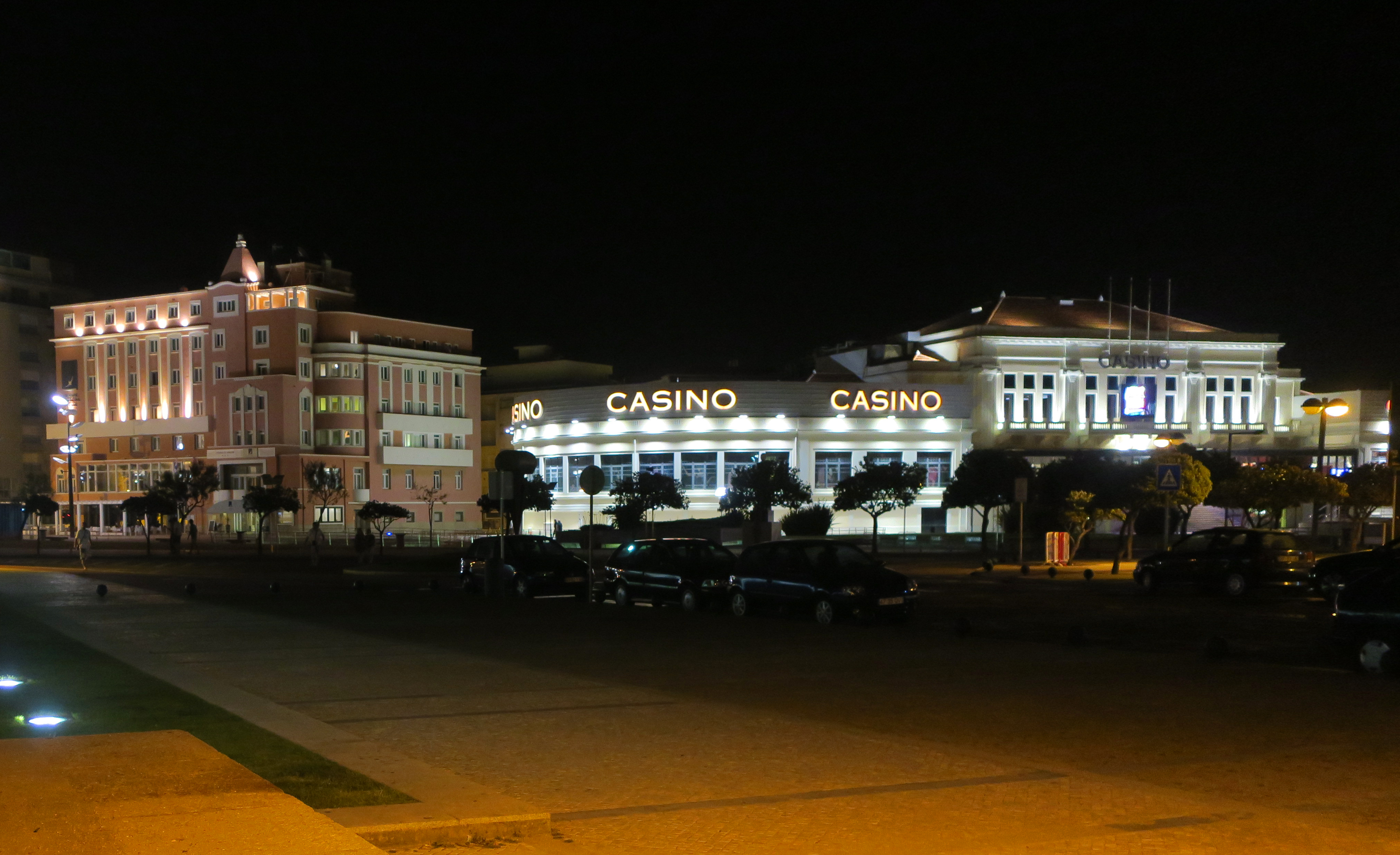
Casino da Póvoa and Grande Hotel da Póvoa in Passeio Alegre.

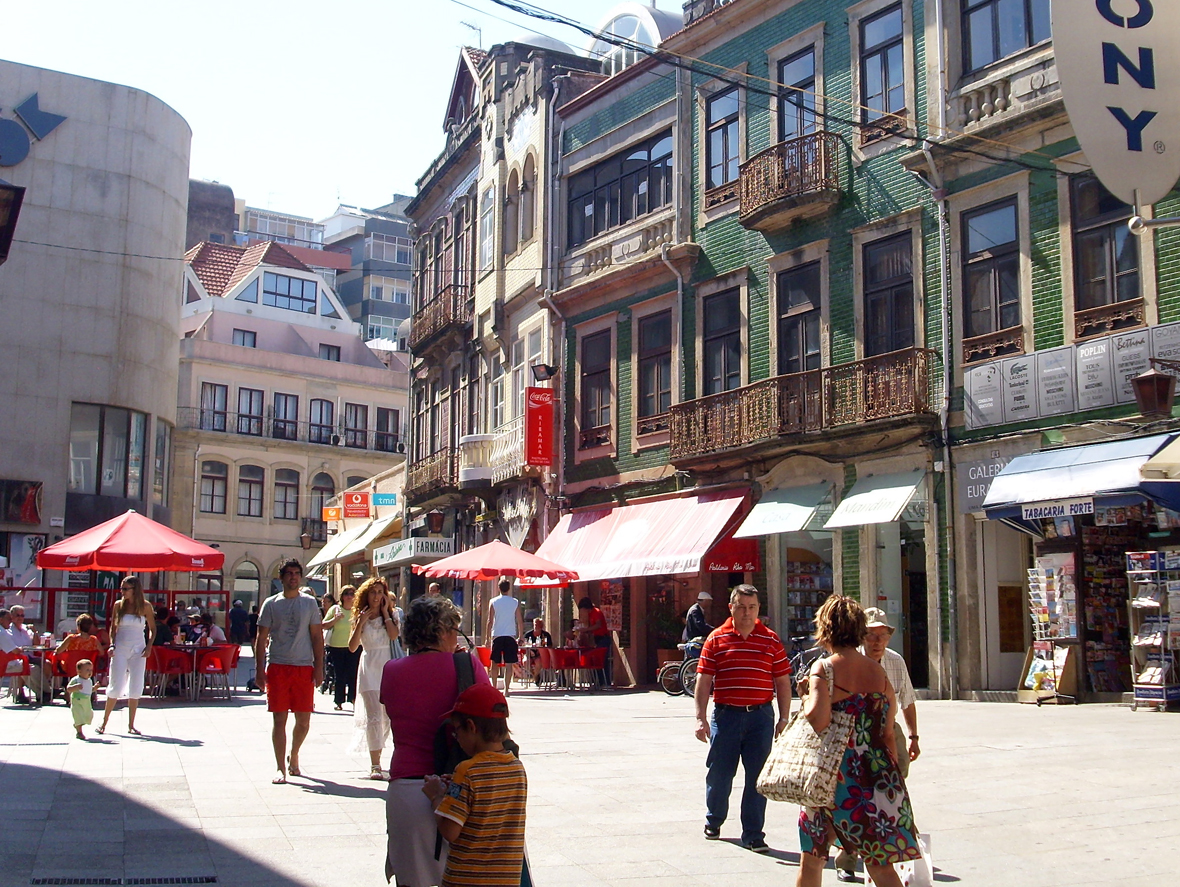
In the 19th century, David Alves Square was a center of culture, musical entertainment, gambling and intellectual tertulia.

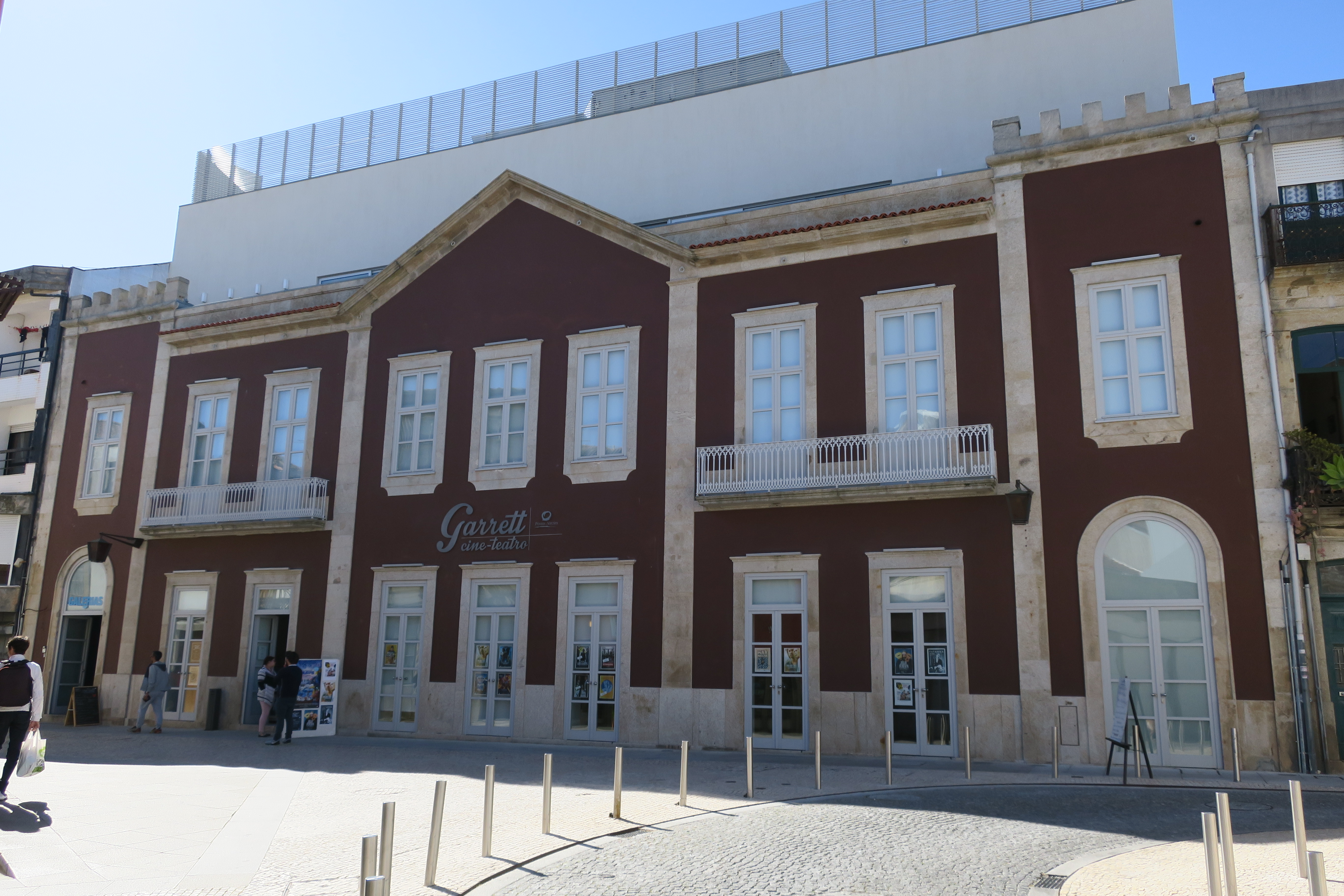
Façade of Garrett Theatre, built in 1890.

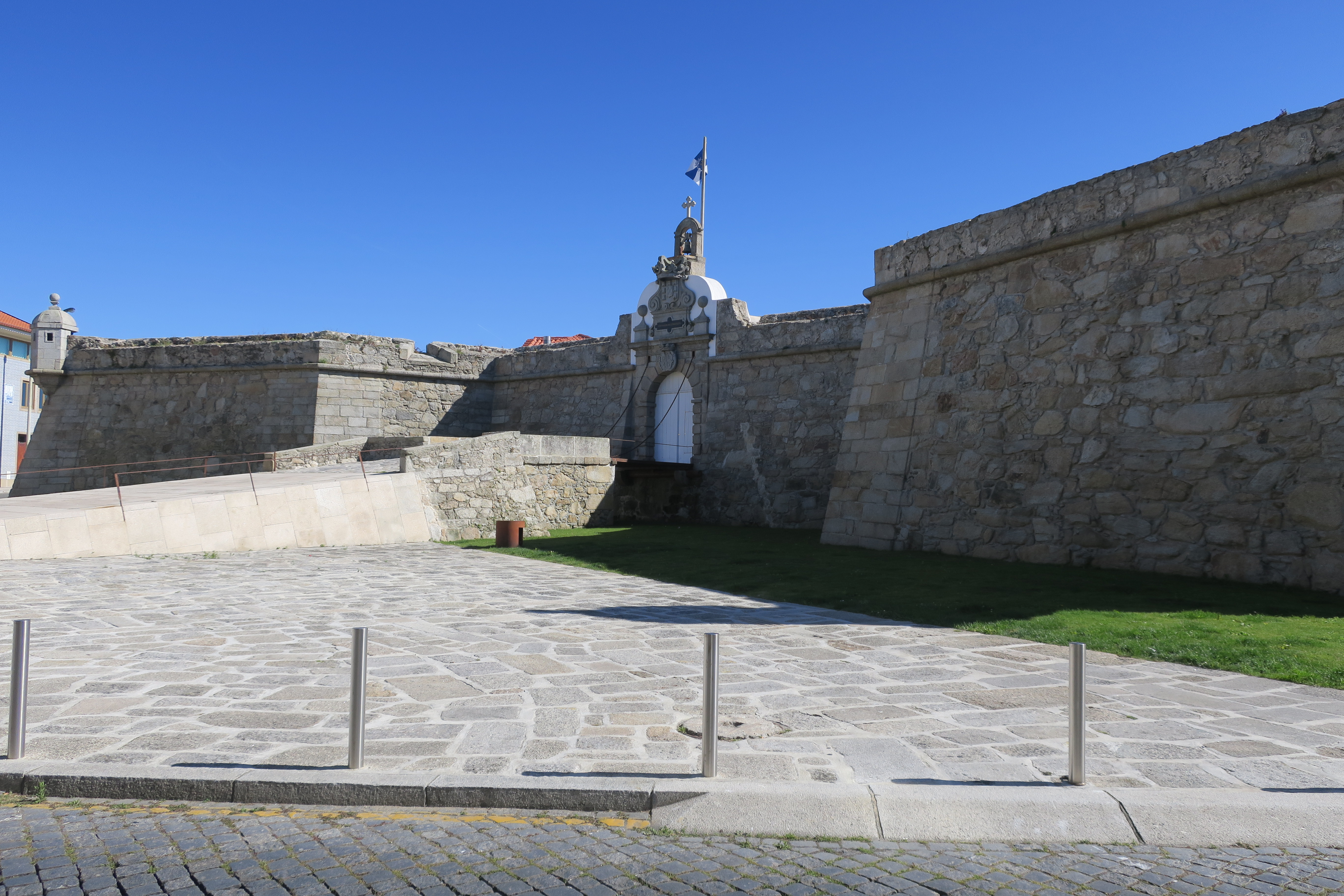
With origins dating to the 15th century, Castelo da Póvoa is currently a fortress used for leisure activities.

Casino da Póvoa is a gaming and entertainment venue since the 1930s. In 2006, it was the second casino in revenues, with 54 million euros and the third most popular with 1.2 million customers. The casino has several bars, a live performances bar, a theater and restaurants, including haute cuisine of local and Portuguese inspiration. In the 19th century, Póvoa had over a dozen gambling venues, such as Salão Chinês, Café Suisso, Café David, Café Universal and Luso-Brasileiro. Póvoa de Varzim has hotels. The most historic of which is the Grande Hotel da Póvoa, built in the 1930s, an arresting modernist building and, siding it, the Hotel Luso-Brasileiro, the oldest in town, running since the 19th century, other 19th-century former hotels are found in the city such as Hotel Universal in Praça do Almada.

Póvoa's theatrical tradition can be traced to 1793 when Italian operas and Portuguese comedies were presented in a theatre built in Campo das Cobras. It developed with Teatro Garrett (1873) and Teatro Sá da Bandeira (1876). The Varazim Teatro is a cultural and youth group of amateur theatre that has encouraged local drama with its own space known as Espaço D'Mente. Póvoa de Varzim Auditorium houses the local school of music and the Póvoa de Varzim Symphony Orchestra, which is the resident orchestra during the Festival Internacional de Música da Póvoa de Varzim, an event established in 1978. Póvoa de Varzim Music Hall is the residence of Banda Musical da Póvoa de Varzim (1864) and its pops orchestra.

The Póvoa de Varzim Bullfighting Arena is used for Portuguese-style bullfighting, horse shows, and concerts. The most important run in the local bullring is Grande Corrida TV Norte (Northern Portugal's TV Great Run) in late July. Others runs are held, such as 18th century-style Gala runs or with horsewomen.

=== Museums ===
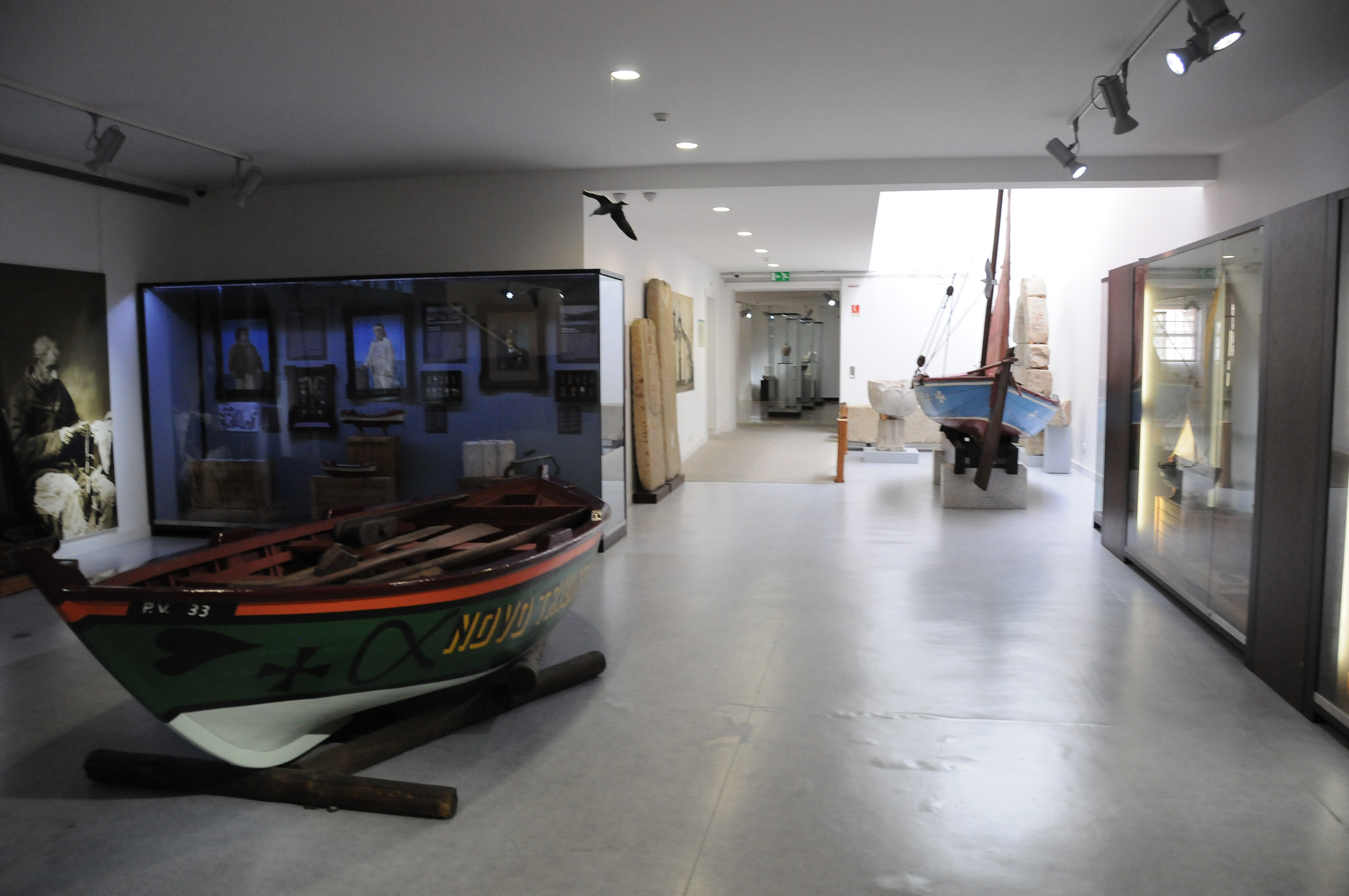
A gallery in the Ethnography and History Museum.

The Ethnography and History Municipal Museum of Póvoa de Varzim (1937) on Rua Visconde de Azevedo houses archaeological finds and exhibits relating to the seafaring history of the city. it is one of the oldest ethnic museums in Portugal and the "Siglas Poveiras" exhibit won the 1980 "European Museum of The Year Award". It possesses ancient sacred art, Poveiro boats and archaeological finds such as Roman inscriptions and Castro culture pottery.

Themed museums exist: Santa Casa Museum with a religious theme, the Museum Nucleus of the Romanesque Church of Saint Peter of Rates, the Archaeological Nucleus of Cividade de Terroso, and the Bullfighting Museum located in Póvoa de Varzim bullring. Another two museums are due to open: Casa do Pescador (Fisherman home) and Farol de Regufe (Regufe lighthouse).

Small art galleries housing contemporary works of art are located in Casino da Póvoa, which exhibits paintings from some of the finest Portuguese artists, and the Ortopóvoa Art Gallery, bordering the Municipal Museum. An arts cooperative created in 1935, A Filantrópica has as its purpose the execution of cultural activities and inducement to artistic creation.

The Rates Ecomuseum is a historical and countryside route, with various stops starting on the Praça (the Square) with the Senhor da Praça baroque chapel, the Rates pillory and the old Rates township house, and primordial springs, wind and water mills, rustic ways and houses. The Arquivo Municipal is the city's archive planned for those who are interested in tracing their family pedigree chart or scrutinize the city's records.

=== Ethnography ===
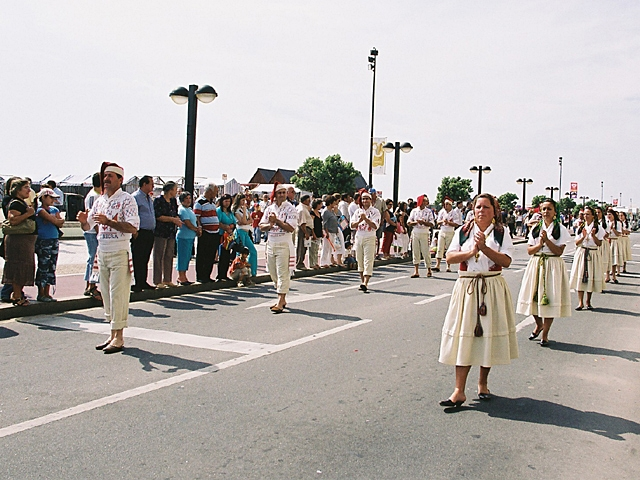
A parade with traditional Branqueta costumes. It includes Camisola Poveira, which is used by men.

The culture of Póvoa de Varzim derives from different working classes and with influences arriving from the maritime route from the Baltic Sea to the Mediterranean. The docudrama film Ala-Arriba! by José Leitão de Barros, popularized this unique Portuguese fishing community within the country during the 1940s. The local expression ala-arriba means "go upwards" and it represents the co-operation between the inhabitants.

Siglas Poveiras are a form of proto-writing system, with a restricted number of symbols that were combined to form more complex symbols; these were used as a rudimentary visual communication system, and as a signature to mark belongings. Merchants wrote them in their books of credit; fishermen used it in religious rituals by marking them in the door of Catholic chapels near hills or beaches; in the table of the church during marriage and in their tombstone; and also had magical significance, such as the São Selimão sigla, that could be used as a protecting symbol and not as family mark. Children used the same family mark with piques as a form of cadency. The youngest son would not have any pique and would inherit his father's symbol. The siglas are still used, though much less commonly, by some families; and are related with Viking traditions.

The Poveiro is a specific genre of boat characterized by a wide flat-bottom and a deep helm. There were diverse boats with different sizes, uses and shapes. The most notable of which, the Lancha Poveira, was believed to be derived from the Drakkar Viking, but without a long stern and bow and with a lateen sail. Each boat carried carvings, namely a sigla poveira mark for boat identification and magical-religious protection at sea. According to a tradition that persists to this day, the youngest son is the heir of the family, as in old Brittany and Denmark, because it was expected that he would take care of his parents when they became old. Women govern the family because men were usually away from home fishing.

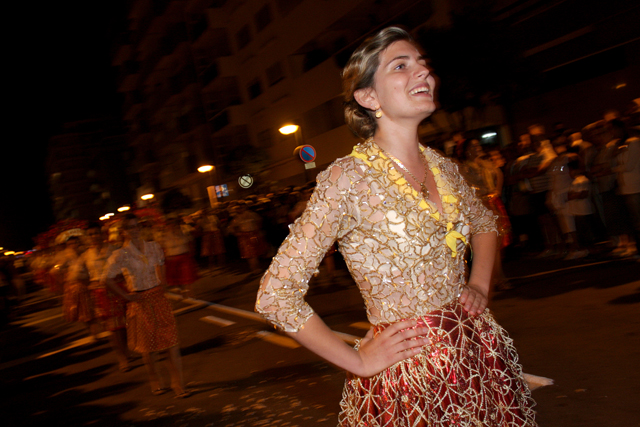
Tricana poveira girl in a "rusga" parade during Saint Peter festival.

The Branqueta is the traditional dress of the fishermen of Póvoa de Varzim. The Camisola Poveira are pullovers, part of the dress, that have fishery motifs in white, black and red, with the name of the owner embroidered in siglas poveiras. Other dresses include the urban tricana poveira for women and children's catalim caps. Handicrafts include the Tapetes de Beiriz rustic carpets.

Formerly, the population was divided into different "castes", Lanchões, Rasqueiros, and Sardinheiros which were stratified depending on their Poveiro boat and fisheries caught. Apart from them, the Lavradores (the farmers) and the Sargaceiros and Seareiros, who went to the sea searching for fertilizers. As a rule, the groups remained distinct, and mixed marriages between them were forbidden, mostly because of the isolationism of the fishermen.

São Félix Hill is a reference point for fishermen at sea and on the last Sunday of May, there is the Pilgrimage of Nossa Senhora da Saúde (Our Lady of Good Health) which covers a distance of 7 km (4.3 mi) between the Matriz Church and the hill. In Cape Santo André there is the Saint's Rock, which has a mark that the Povoan fishermen believe to be a footprint of Saint Andrew. The saint is seen as the "Boatman of Souls", fishing the souls of those who drown in the sea after a shipwreck and helped in fisheries and marriages. The procession to the cape occurs on the dawn of the last day of November, when groups of men and women, wearing black hoods and holding lamps, go to the chapel via the beach. On 15 August, the pinnacle of the fishermen's Feast of the Assumption occurs in the seaport with carefully arranged boats and fireworks. In mid-September, there's the Senhora das Dores festival with the century-old Pottery Fair.

=== Cuisine ===
The most traditional ingredients of the local cuisine are locally grown vegetables and fish. The fish used in the traditional cuisine are divided in two categories, the "poor" fish (sardine, ray, mackerel, and others) and the "wealthy" fish (such as whiting, snook, and alfonsino). The most famous local dish is Pescada à Poveira (Poveira Whiting), whose main ingredients are, along with the fish that gives the name to the dish, potatoes, eggs and a boiled onion and tomato sauce. Other fishery dishes include the Arroz de Sardinha (sardine rice), Caldeirada de Peixe (fish stew), Lulas Recheadas à Poveiro (Poveiro stuffed squids), Arroz de Marisco (seafood rice) and Lagosta Suada (steamed spiny lobster). Shellfish and boiled iscas, pataniscas, and bolinhos de bacalhau are popular snacks. Other dishes include Feijoada Poveira, made with white beans and served with dry rice (arroz seco); and Francesinha Poveira made in long bread that first appeared in 1962 as fast food for holidaymakers.

Restaurants specializing in Portuguese barbecued chicken, seafood, francesinha, bacalhau can be found along the Estrada Nacional 13 road and other areas of the city.

=== Sports ===
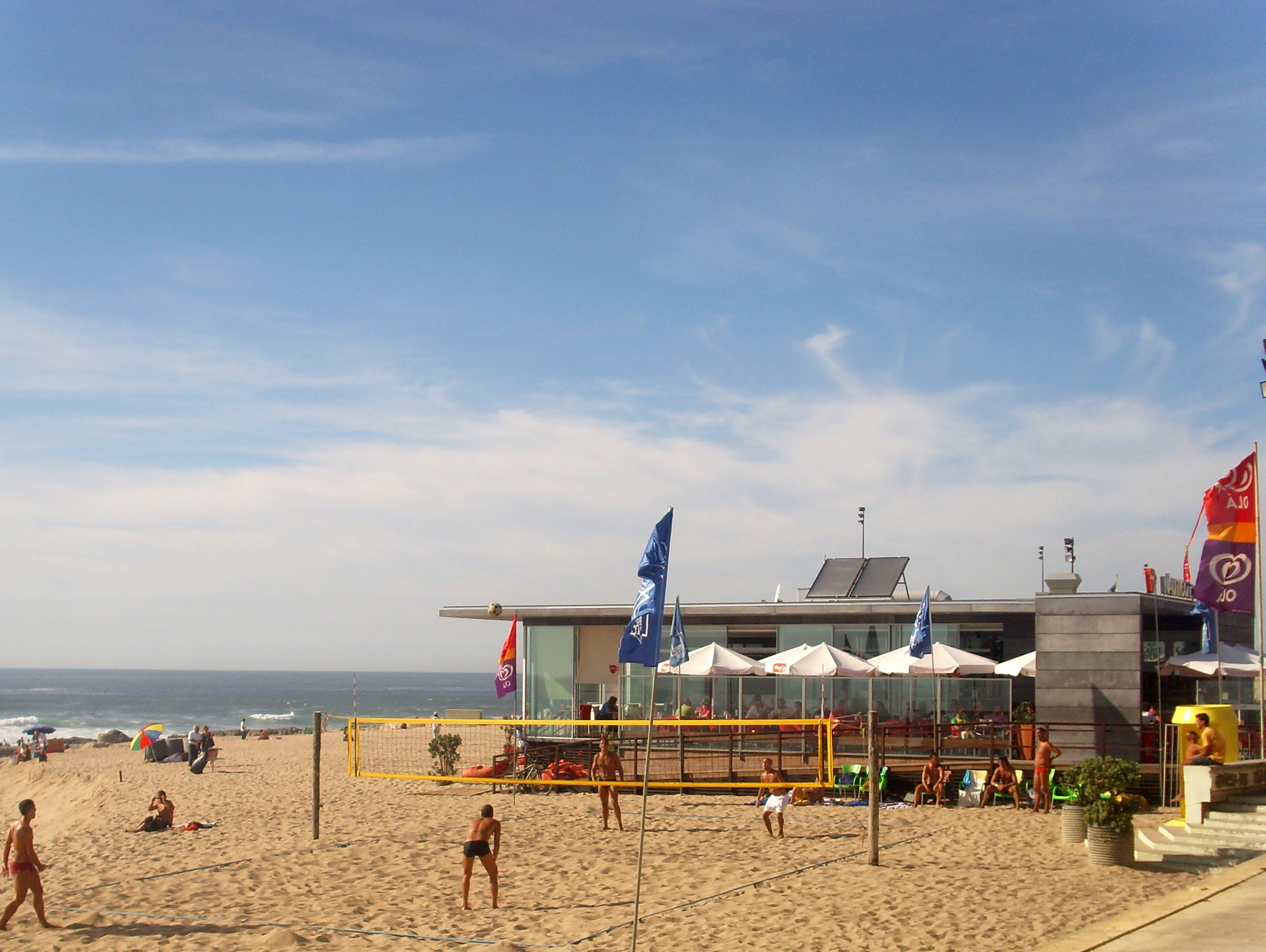
An occasional beach volleyball game in October. Beach volleyball, footvolley and beach tennis are popular sports from March to October.

The city has developed a number of sporting venues and has hosted several national, European and world championships in different sports. 38% of the population practised sport, a high rate when compared to the national average. Several sports venues are located in the Northside around Avenida Vasco da Gama.

The most popular sport in Póvoa de Varzim is association football. The city is home to Varzim SC, a professional football club, who play in Estádio do Varzim on the North Side. City Park's Stadium and surrounding football fields are the main stage for Póvoa de Varzim's People's championship where its junior and senior football clubs compete: Aguçadoura, Amorim, Argivai, Averomar, Balazar, Barreiros, Beiriz, Belém, Estela, Juve Norte, Laundos, Leões da Lapa, Mariadeira, Matriz, Navais, Rates, Regufe, Terroso, and Unidos ao Varzim.

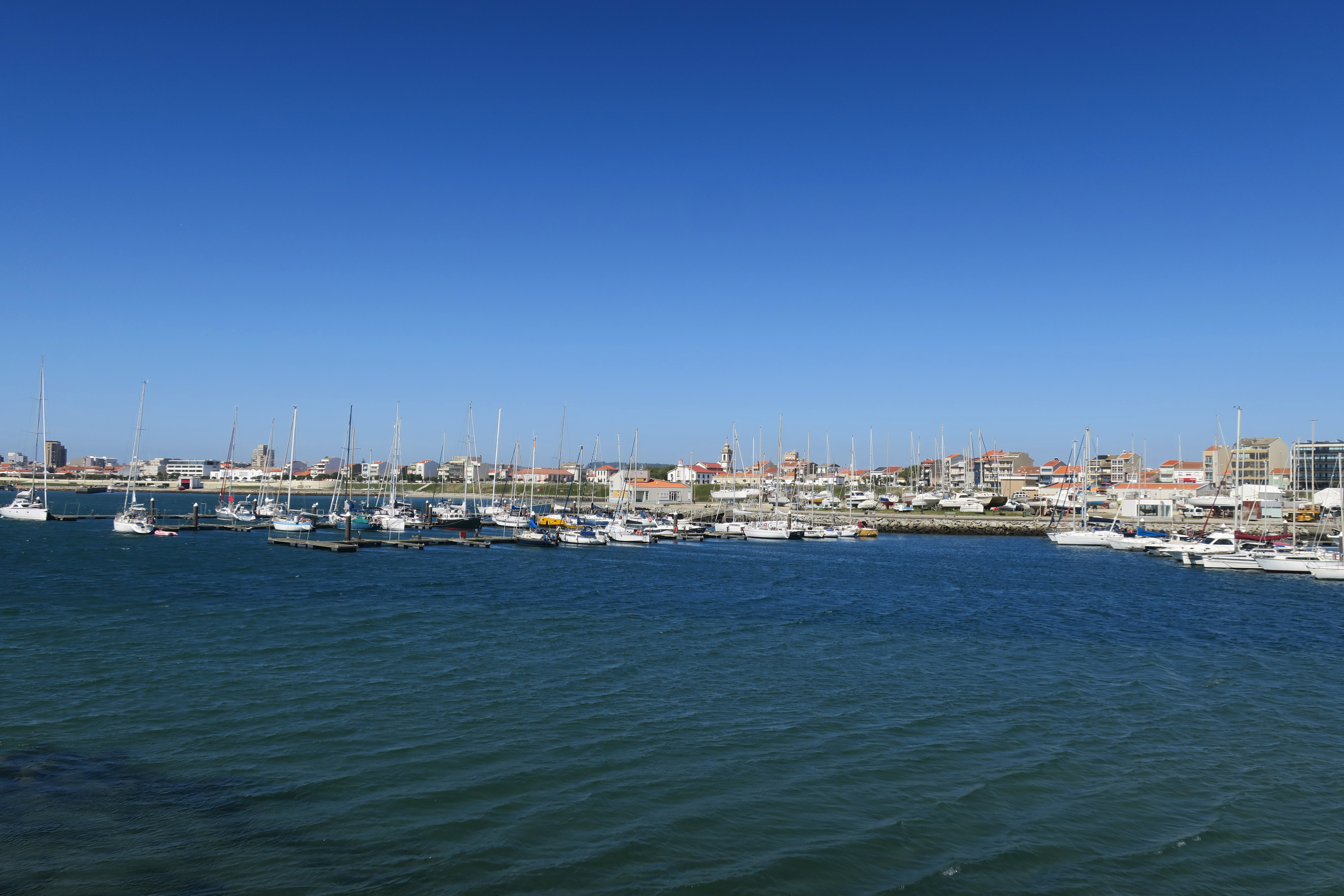
Póvoa Marina is managed by Clube Naval Povoense.

Swimming is the second most practised sport. There are two swimming pool complexes next to each other in the Northside: one Municipally owned and another one privately held. The city pool complex is managed by Varzim Lazer. The venue has several pools including an Olympic-size swimming pool and swimming lessons for babies, children, and adults. It also holds the International Meeting of Póvoa de Varzim, in long course pool, part of the European winter calendar. The other complex is property of Clube Desportivo da Póvoa. The site also offers swimming lessons and some swimming pools, including a heated saltwater swimming pool filled with Póvoa de Varzim's seawater.

Clube Desportivo da Póvoa competes in several sports, including rink hockey, volleyball, basketball, footvolley, auto racing, judo, badminton, and athletics. In the North side, there's also the Clube da Praia focusing on padel, tennis, and squash courts surrounded by a private beach shaded by palm trees. Beach volley and footvolley are popular sports, and it was in Póvoa that footvolley was, for the first time, practiced in Portugal.

Due to its location and suitable urban areas, board culture is omnipresent in Póvoa de Varzim. Bodyboarders and surfers meet at Salgueira Beach. In Lota, a recreation area for several audiences, is especially popular amongst the skater and biker communities, and is considered the most charismatic skater area in the country.

The marina, near the seaport, offers sea activities developed by the local yacht club – the Clube Naval Povoense. Costa Verde Trophy, linking Póvoa and Viana do Castelo, is one of the regattas organized by the club and Rally Portugal yacht racing is a sailing and sightseeing event along the west Iberian coast.

The municipal company, Varzim Lazer, holds the Pavilhão da Póvoa, a multi-functional indoor arena and the Póvoa de Varzim Bullfighting Arena. Other clubs for other sports also exists: Póvoa Futsal Club in futsal, Clube de Andebol da Póvoa de Varzim in handball, Clube de Atletismo da Póvoa de Varzim in Athletics. There's also Póvoa de Varzim and Vila do Conde united clubs exists for baseball and American football, Villas Vikings and Villas Titans, respectively. In athletics, the Grande Prémio de São Pedro (Saint Peter Grand Prix), which occurs in the city's streets during the summer, is part of the national calendar of the Portuguese Athletics Federation. Other notable annual events, includes the Cego do Maio Half Marathon and the Grande Prémio da Marginal (Waterfront Grand Prix), the later goes along the Póvoa de Varzim and Vila do Conde beachfront, aiming for the funding of the National Association of Paramiloidosis. In cycling, it hosts the Clássica da Primavera (Spring Classic) in April. Mountain bike events are common. Along the sand dunes, the Estela links golf course was considered by Golf Digest as the 5th best golf course in Portugal.

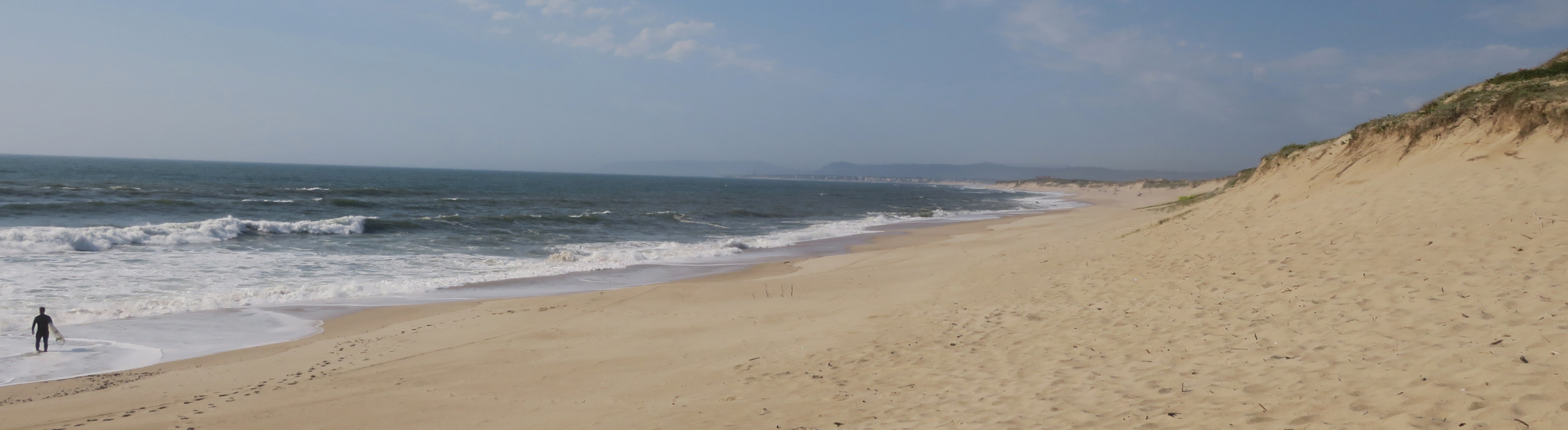
Póvoa de Varzim has diverse and high-quality surf spots: along the dunes of the Northwestern coast (pictured), in the countryside, and in the southwestern beaches of the city center.

=== Media ===
O Comércio da Póvoa de Varzim (est. 1903), A Voz da Póvoa (est. 1938), and Póvoa Semanário, which appeared during the 1990s, are Póvoa de Varzim's major weekly newspapers; while the Gazeta da Póvoa de Varzim (1870–1874) was the first local newspaper. Most are dedicated to local news and have Internet editions.

The local radio stations Rádio Mar (89.0) and Radio Onda Viva (96.1) broadcast on FM and online. The stations' programming include local news and sports and feature an in-depth look at the city's top news by interviewing a guest at lunchtime on weekends. Radio Onda Viva airs Mandarin Chinese programming daily. The radio station, Rádio Mar, and the newspaper Póvoa Semanário belong to the same group; the same company offers news services to the neighbouring cities of Vila do Conde and Esposende.

== Public services ==
=== Education ===
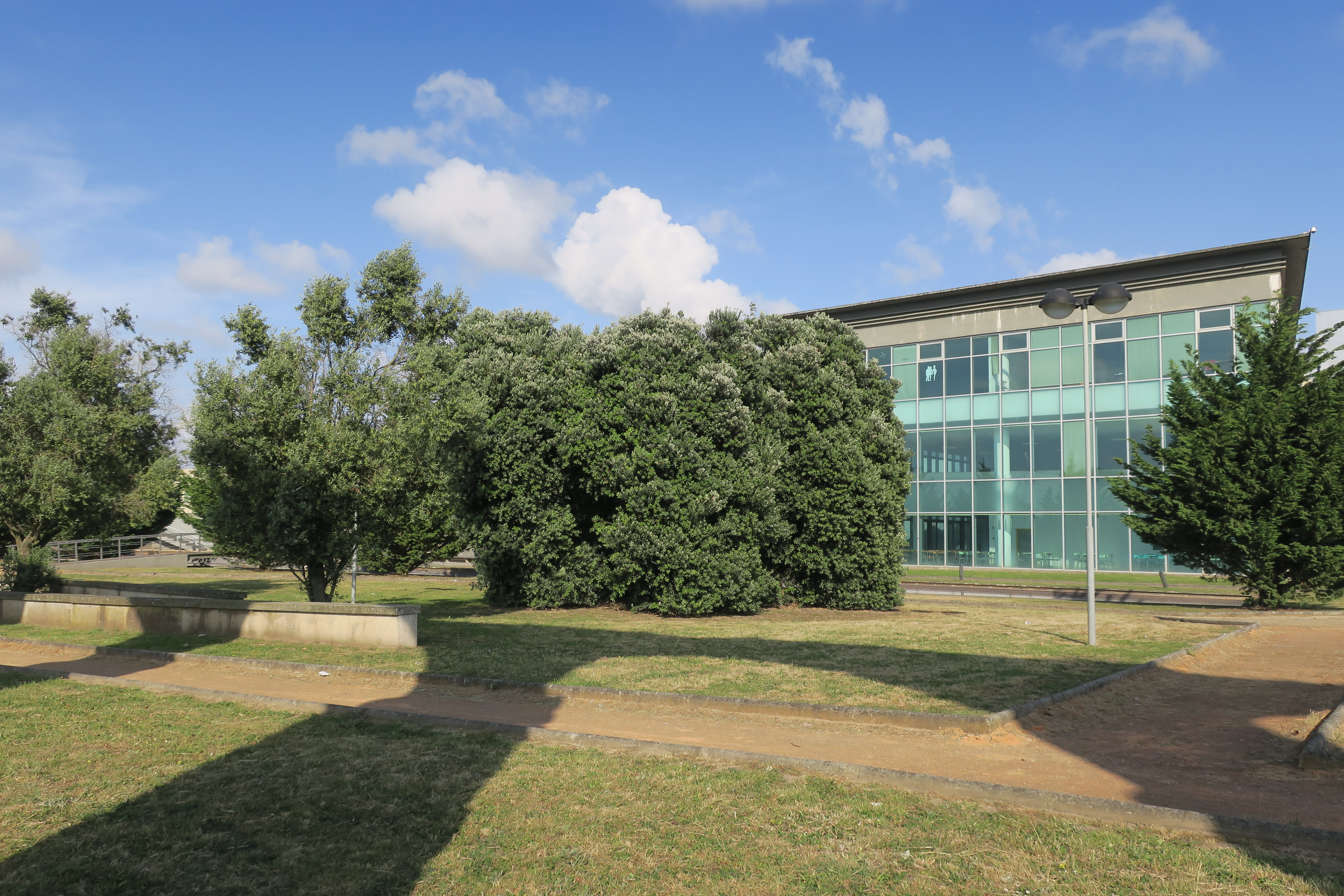
Campus 2 of the Technical University of Porto.

Higher education in the region has a dynamic history and growing availability. The Póvoa de Varzim/Vila do Conde campus, also known as Campus 2 of the Technical University of Porto (Universidade Técnica do Porto), houses the Superior School of Hospitality and Tourism — which maintains its polytechnic nature — and the Faculty of Media, Arts and Design. The latter faculty is centered around creativity and employability, offering academic choices focused on design, cinema, photography, multimedia, and the Web. Campus 2 was built in 2001, spanning 31,544 square metres (7.795 acres) with state-of-the-art facilities such as three amphitheaters, a large library, an auditorium, and a research space.

The campus's origins lie in the former School of Industrial Studies and Management founded in 1990, which originally offered undergraduate and postgraduate education in management and technology. Under the framework of the Technical University of Porto, the campus is poised for strategic expansion, adaptation, and further academic internationalization.

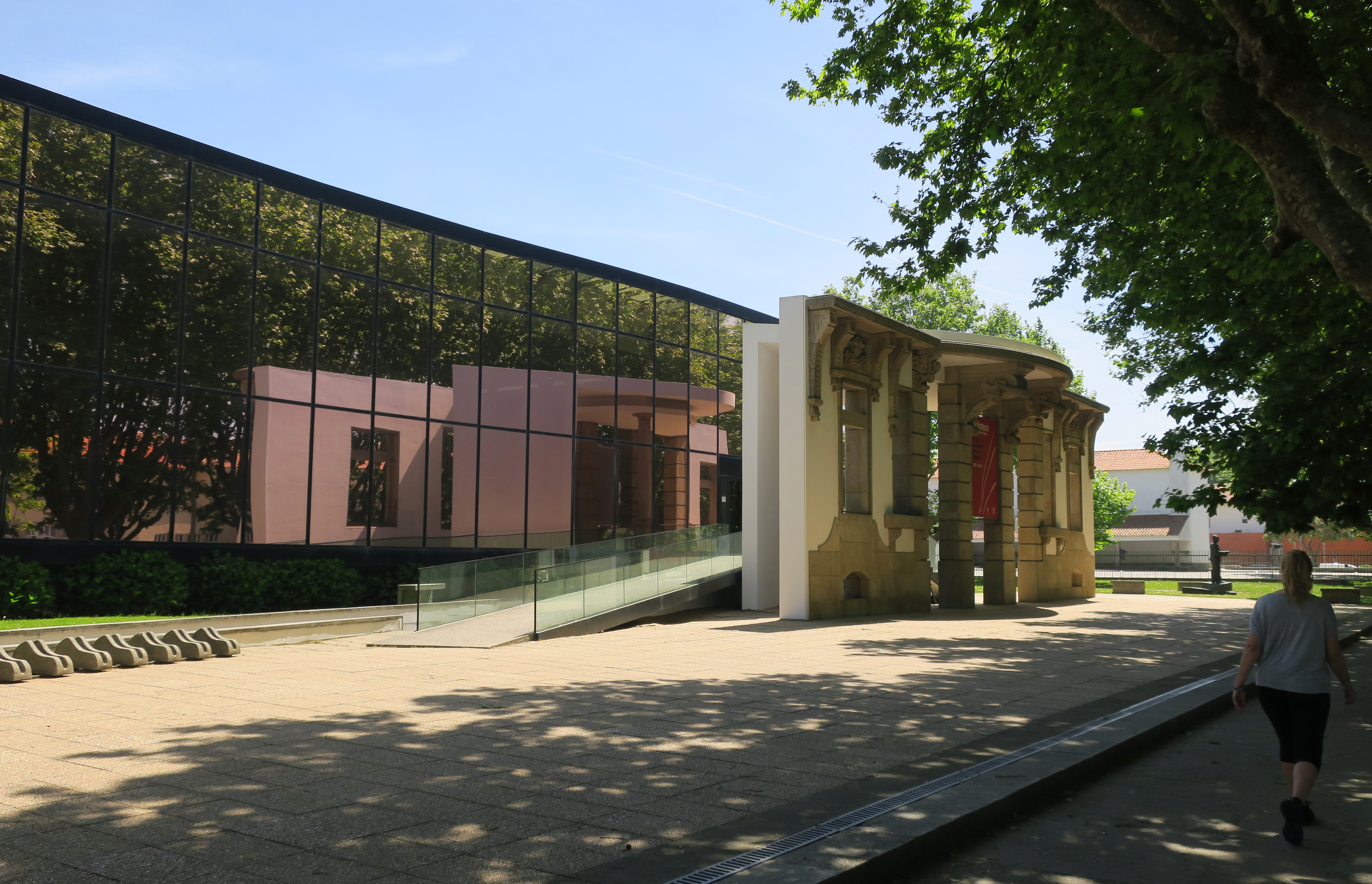
Rocha Peixoto Library. Contemporary architecture (1991) juxtaposed by 1921 historic architecture.

Póvoa de Varzim has public, denominational and independent schools in the city and outskirts. Public education in the municipality is provided by five school districts: Flávio Gonçalves, Cego do Maio, Aver-o-Mar, Campo Aberto, and Rates. These school districts arrange kindergartens and schools to the 9th grade of different locations of the municipality and are headed by Escolas de Educação Básica do 2.° e 3.°Ciclo (6th to the 9th-grade schools) that give the name to each district. Private schools are primarily run by Catholic parishes or groups, the most notable of which is the Colégio do Sagrado Coração de Jesus. The Grande Colégio da Póvoa de Varzim and Campo Verde School of Agriculture are eminent independent schools and MAPADI is a large facility and school for children with down syndrome.

Secondary education (10th to the 12th grade) is provided in the school section at Póvoa city centre: Escola Secundária Eça de Queirós and Escola Secundária Rocha Peixoto and by the Colégio de Amorim, an independent school in the outskirts. Eça de Queirós was a lyceum created in 1904 that maintains its humanist outlook and Rocha Peixoto was a former industrial and commercial school created in 1924.

The Rocha Peixoto Municipal Library, established in 1880, was housed in the current building in 1991. the public library system includes some branches in the suburbs, Diana Bar Beach Library and the Garden Library of Casa Manuel Lopes, a youth seasonal library during the month of August.

=== Healthcare ===
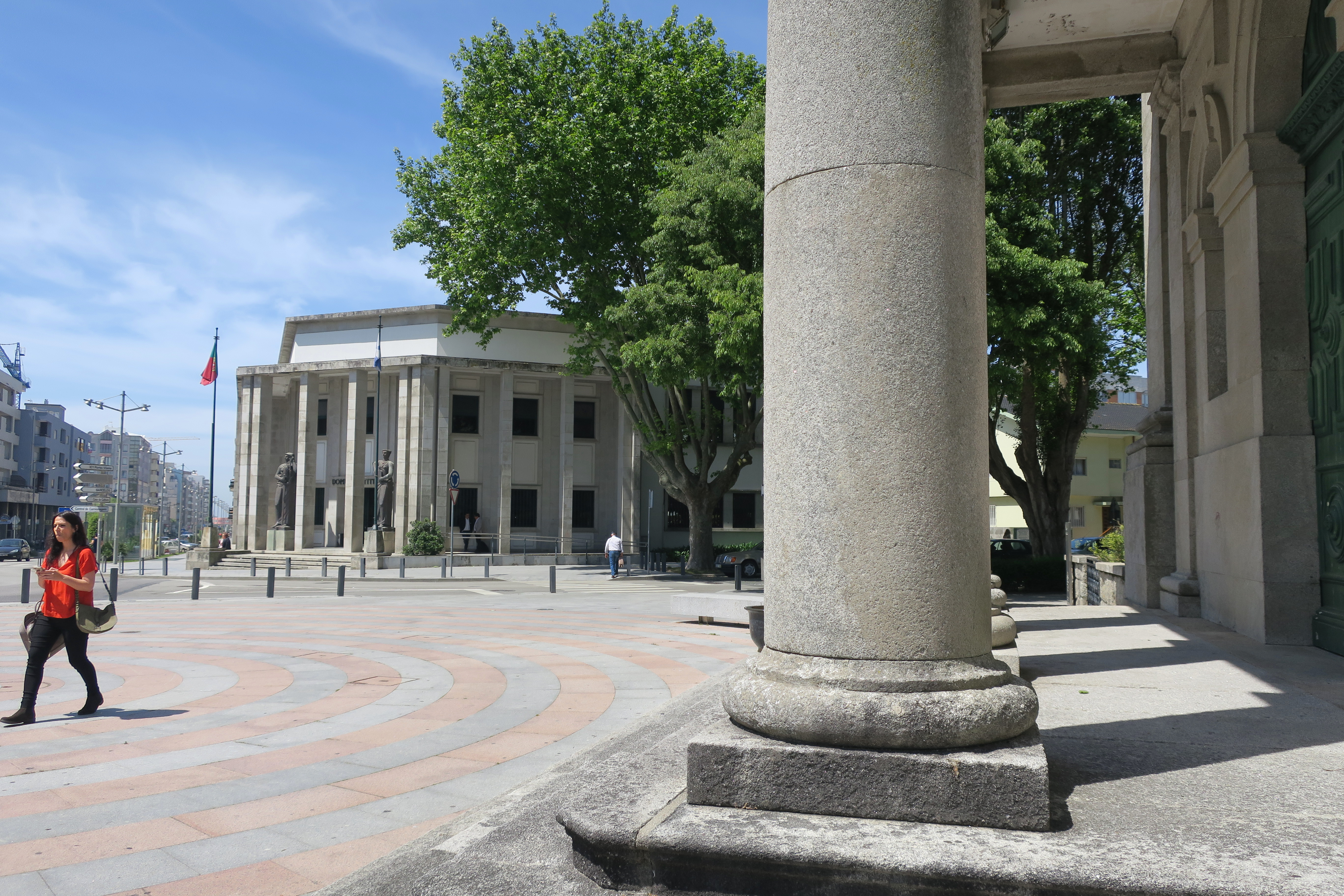
Palace of Justice in Largo das Dores. It houses the Central civil court for six municipalities of Greater Porto.

The first healthcare structure, the Santa Casa da Misericórdia da Póvoa de Varzim (Holy House of Mercy), opened in 1756. The hospitals of the city are the São Pedro Pescador Hospital (state-run) in Largo das Dores and the privately held Hospital da Luz Póvoa de Varzim (notable private hospital previously known as Clipóvoa) in Rua Manuel I street. The public hospital suffers from a lack of bed spaces. Due to this, it underwent expansion works and there is an ongoing plan to build a modern hospital on the border between the cities of Póvoa de Varzim and Vila do Conde, to serve the population of both municipalities. The Centro de Saúde da Póvoa de Varzim (Health Centre) is a public primary care building that has extensions in the main suburbs.

Póvoa de Varzim Animal Emergency Ambulance is a 24-hour service for pets articulated with the local veterinary hospitals and A Cerca animal shelter which started operating in 2018. It is the first service of this kind in Northern Portugal. It is operated by Póvoa de Varzim firefighters.

=== Public safety ===
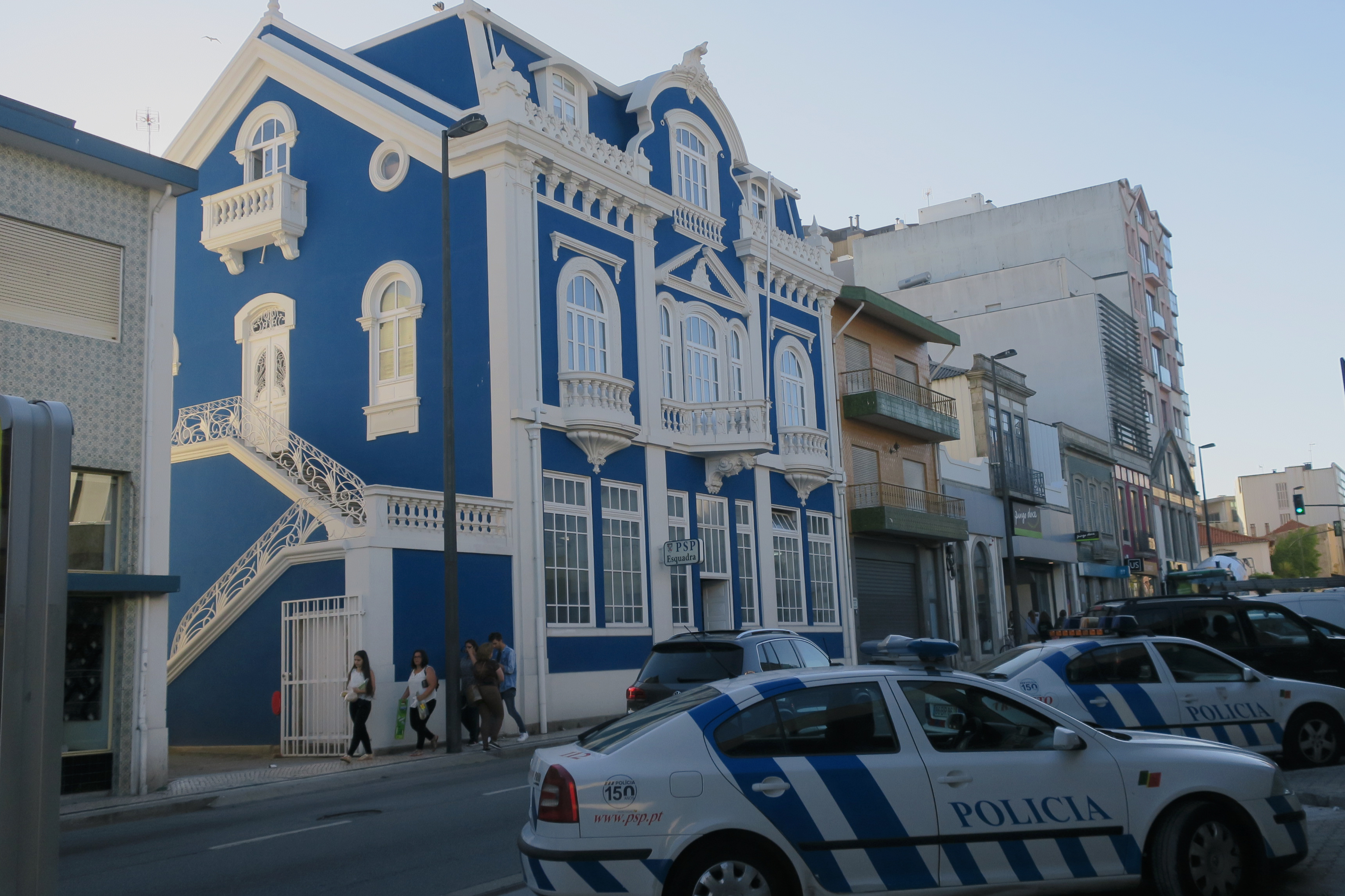
The PSP Police station is housed in an historic mantion, the Palacete do Postiga.

The Municipal Police of Póvoa de Varzim is an administrative police force that acts solely within the municipality and reports directly to the mayor and it is headquartered in the former Póvoa de Varzim Barracks, the Quartel, in Rua Rocha Peixoto. The Polícia de Segurança Pública (PSP) does the city policing and it is headquartered in the Esquadra, police station located in Praça Marquês de Pombal, while the Guarda Nacional Republicana (GNR) is responsible for the countryside and its territorial station or Posto Territorial da Póvoa de Varzim is located in Largo das Dores. Póvoa de Varzim had a crime rate of 27.1 per 1,000 residents in 2015, ranking among the safest municipalities in metropolitan Porto. It is considered by the PSP police as a "calm" zone in all categories of offense; violent crime, in particular, is practically non-existent. Mostly, crime consists of minor robberies to homes, stores, or from cars.

The Royal Humanitarian Association of Volunteer Firefighters or Real Associação Humanitária dos Bombeiros Voluntários is a volunteer fire department which faces diverse firefighting challenges, from family homes, high-rise buildings to wildfires. It was established in 1877 and granted the royal title in 1904, which it retains. Its headquarters are located in Rua Santos Minho, with the station and engines facing nearby Rua Arquitecto Ventura Terra.

Os Delfins is a professional lifeguard service and school which patrols the beaches of Póvoa de Varzim and Vila do Conde, it currently has activities elsewhere in Northern Portugal. This Póvoa-based association uses the dolphin as the mascot and in naming. The lifeguards can be identified on the beaches by their yellow T-shirts with red captions. Póvoa is one of the twelve national sea borders controlled by the Serviço de Estrangeiros e Fronteiras (SEF) and it as an ISN Lifeboat rescue station. The Póvoa de Varzim Maritime Police patrols Póvoa de Varzim seafront, including the seaport, beaches and maritime waters under the national sovereignty and jurisdiction. It often acts against illegal fisheries, unruly harvest of shellfish, and smuggling. The Póvoa de Varzim and Vila do Conde Maritime Police Picket are headquartered in Largo Dr. Vasques Calafate, sharing resources with the Captaincy of the Port of Póvoa de Varzim.

Póvoa de Varzim is home to the Escola dos Serviços, a Portuguese military base unit for logistics, military education and training, and financial resources. It includes a command, army staff, the Commander and Services Company, and the Battalion of Service and Support to Military Instruction. The unit is hair to the Battalion of Military Administration that was transferred to Póvoa de Varzim in December 1914 to prepare for the Portuguese participation in World War I. The current base unit was built in 1994 and it increased in military personnel, duties and responsibilities in 2006.

== Transport ==
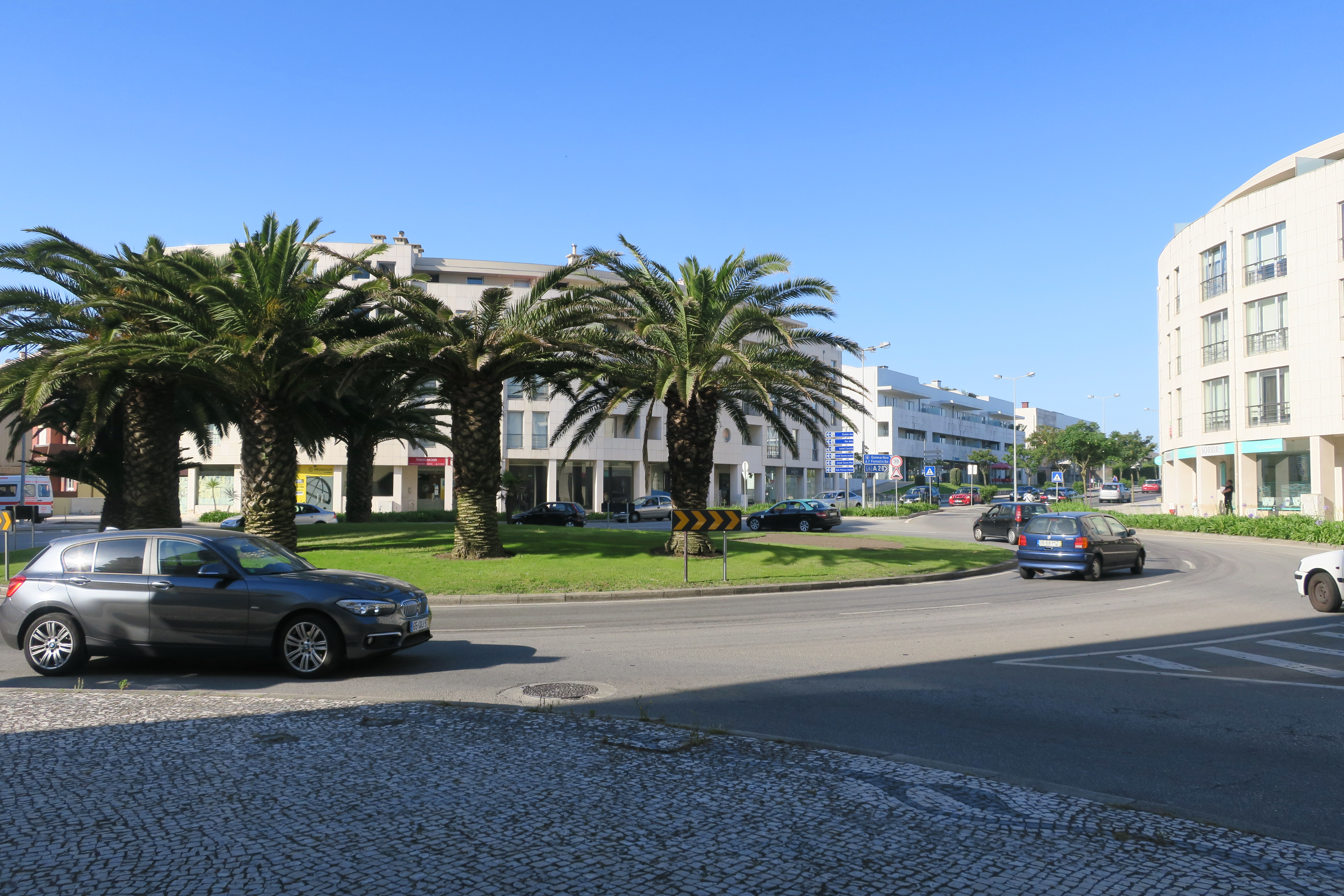
Roundabouts are the preferred method for traffic management in Póvoa de Varzim.

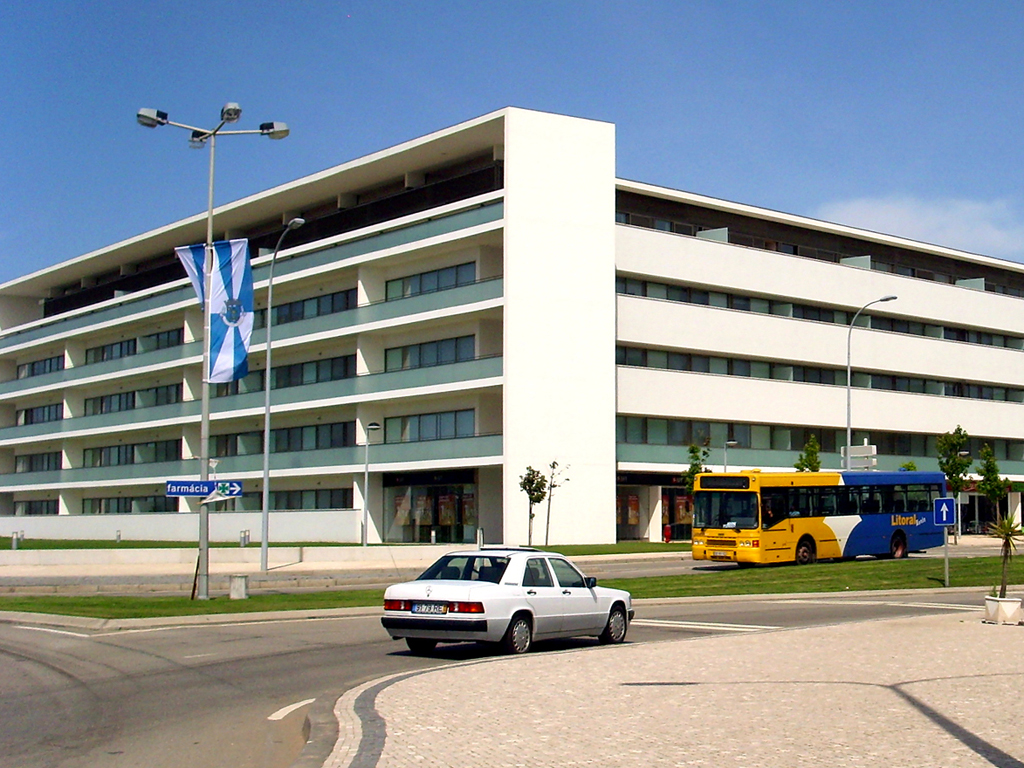
Line A bus leaving 25 de Abril Avenue during the Amorim Industry Area – Caxinas route.

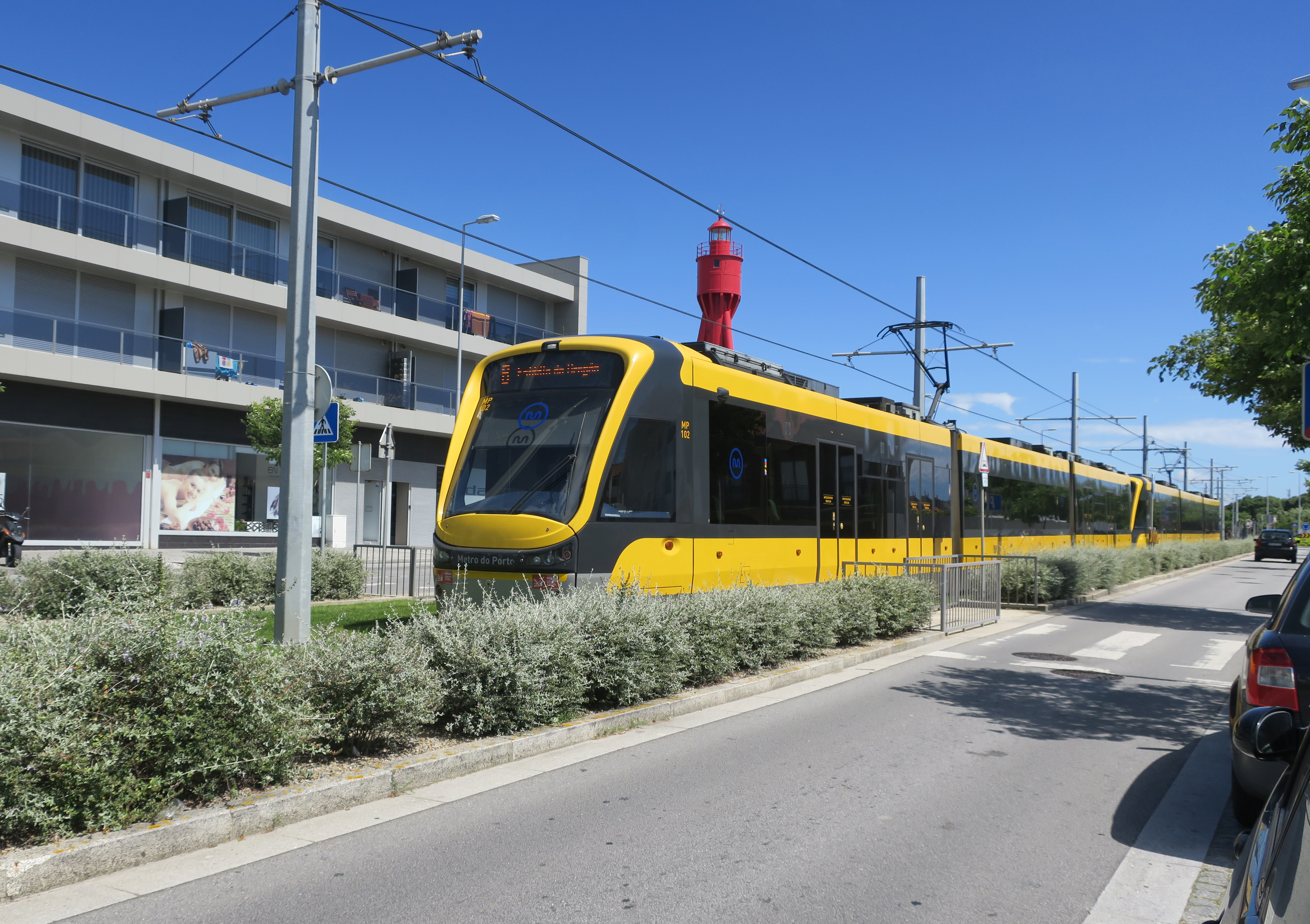
Line B Porto Metro tram-train in 2017.

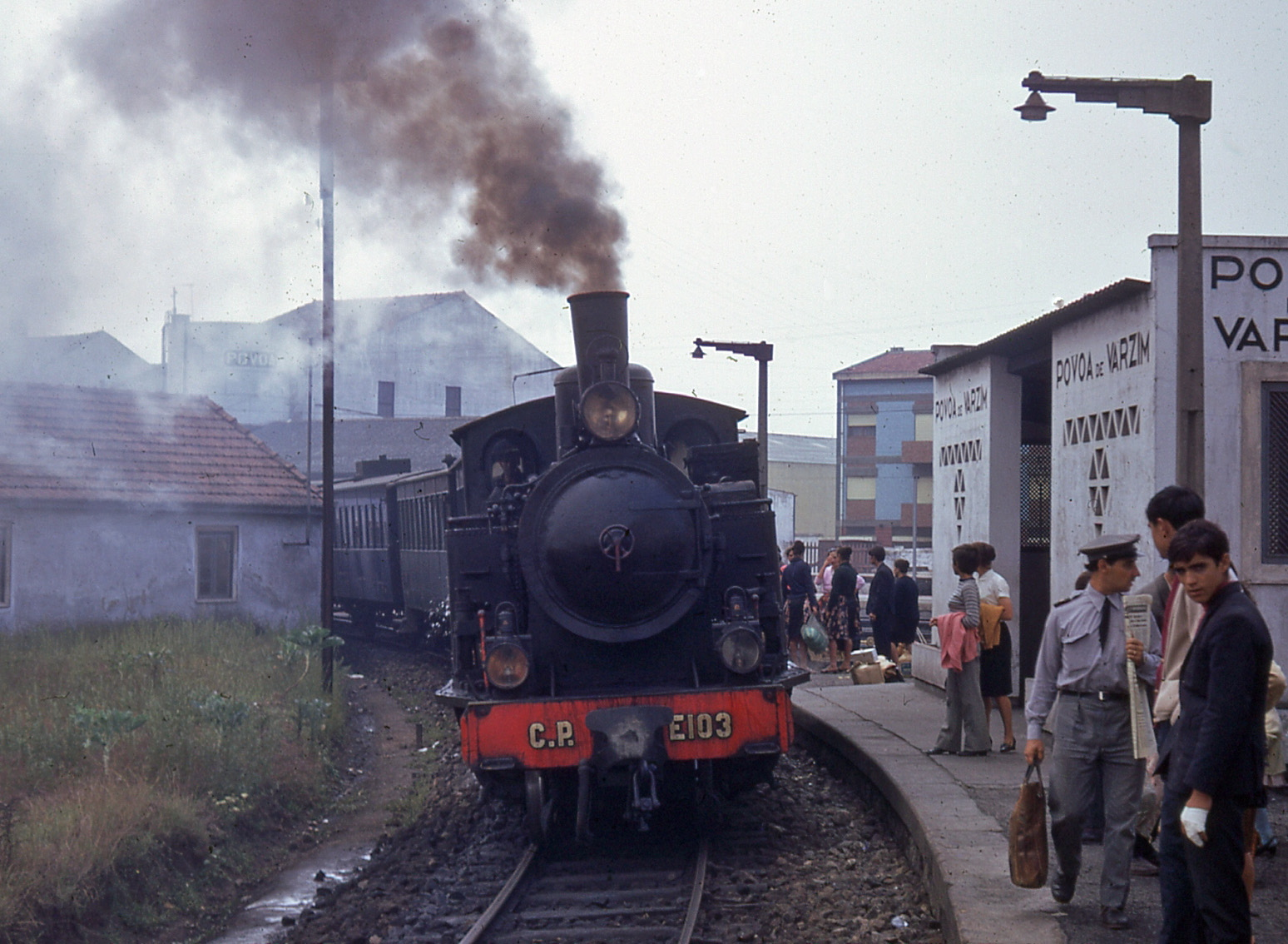
Steam train on the former route to Famalicão in 1970.

Póvoa de Varzim has a transportation system that includes travel by sea, air, and land. On land, the city is connected by motorways, highways, and the Porto Metro. These transport options, along with the airport, bus station, marina, and harbour, are used daily by locals and visitors.

Public transport in the city is run by private companies. The Central de Camionagem bus station is a hub for city and long-distance buses, offering connections to nearby rural areas, Porto, the Minho region, and Galicia in Spain. Litoral Norte operates an urban bus network with five routes, while Linhares, the city’s oldest bus company, is now owned by Transdev.

Taxis in Póvoa de Varzim are black with an olive-green roof. The main taxi stands are in Praça do Almada, near the metro station, and at Largo das Dores. Taxi services, including Central Táxis Ribamar and Táxis Póvoa, also offer tours to attractions outside the city, such as the Discovery Age ship replica in Vila do Conde, the medieval churches of Rates and Rio Mau, the ancient settlement of Cividade de Terroso, and São Félix Hill.

=== Air ===
The Francisco Sá Carneiro Airport (IATA: OPO, ICAO: LPPR) is located 18 km (11 mi) south of Póvoa de Varzim. The airport, known outside the region as Porto Airport, is the second-busiest international airport in Portugal, moving over 10.7 million passengers in 2017. Using cars or taxis, it is fast accessible (17 minutes) via the A28 motorway, linked to the A41 motorway and the airport's drop-off and pick-up areas, or the EN13 highway, the later using the airport's EN107 accessway. Póvoa Aerodrome, officially known as S. Miguel de Laundos, is small-sized, with only 270 meters long for ultralight aviation and other small planes for leisure activities.

=== Rail ===
Line B of the Porto Metro connects the station at Póvoa de Varzim to Porto and its airport. It offers two services: a regular train and a faster shuttle called the Expresso. The line was built on an old railway that first opened in 1875. This railway was extended to Famalicão in 1881 but the extension was closed in 1995 and later became a walking and cycling path.

By changing trains at Verdes station, the Porto Metro connects Póvoa de Varzim to the airport.

=== Roads ===
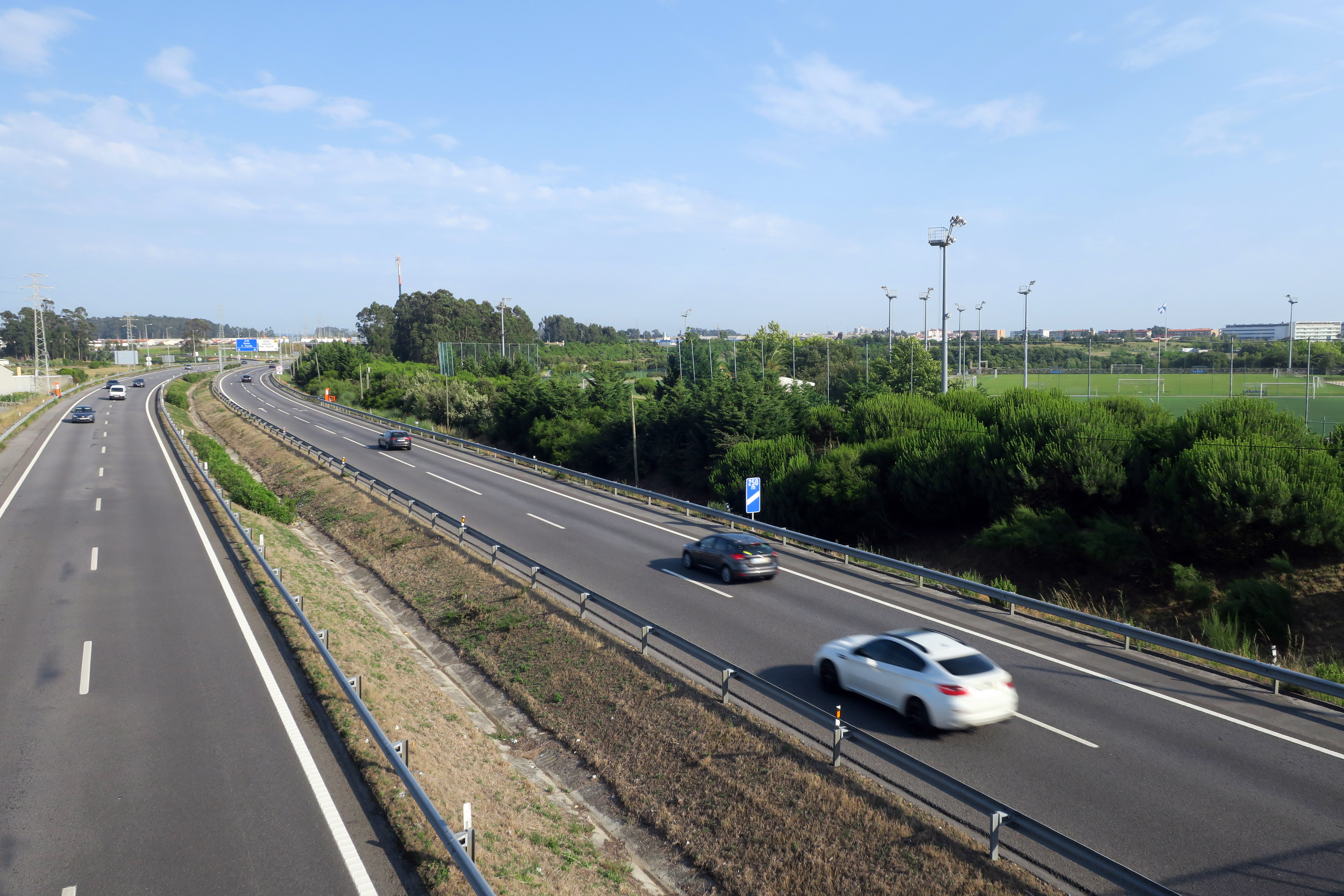
The A28 near the City Park.

The city is connected by road on a north–south axis reaching Viana do Castelo and the Spanish border to Porto by the A28 motorway. In Greater Porto, the A28 has the most popular suburban commercial areas of Northern Portugal with suburban shopping centers, large stand-alone stores, retail parks and outlets and reaches Porto's major thoroughfares and ring roads, including the VCI inner orbital motorway. Póvoa is also reached by the A7 (from Guimarães and Vila Nova de Famalicão) and A11 (from Braga and Barcelos) motorways on an east–west axis, through the south and north of the city, in that order, and both cross the A28. With these motorways, Póvoa de Varzim is accessible within minutes and central in the Northern Littoral Urban-Metropolitan Region of Northern Portugal, with 2.99 million inhabitants (2001 census).

Although it lost usefulness for long distances, the National Roads system has acquired local importance: EN13 that cuts the city in half, in a north–south direction, is used by commuters originating from the northern suburbs and from Vila do Conde, in the south, to travel downtown. The EN205 and the EN206 are used by commuters starting from the interior of the municipality.

The traditional road system of the city, composed of roads that run parallel in the direction of the sea, can be seen in any of the following avenues: Avenida do Mar, Avenida Vasco da Gama, Avenida Mouzinho de Albuquerque, and Avenida Santos Graça. The Avenida dos Descobrimentos and Avenida dos Banhos, in other hand, run parallel to the coast. The growth of the city inland and northwards made ring roads more important, this can be seen in Avenida 25 de Abril, an urban belt road.

=== Bikeways ===
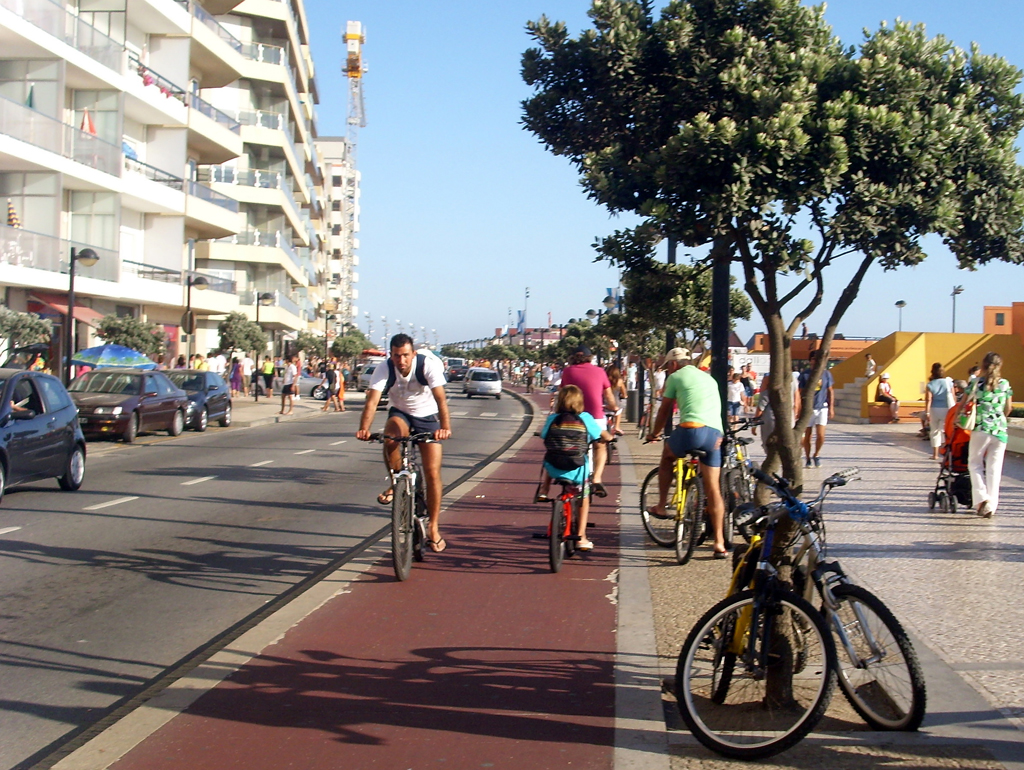
The Marginal Bikeway.

The main bike paths in Póvoa de Varzim — known as ciclovias in Portuguese — are the Marginal in the coastal area, the Ecopista linking the city and the countryside, the Parque da Cidade, linking the City Park and the beaches, and the Via B, the urban-belt bike path. The bikeways are all interlinked. The Marginal bikeway was built in 1998 and runs for 2 km in Póvoa de Varzim, going through the main beaches of Avenida dos Banhos and around the seaport. It extends for another 3.5 km across the Vila do Conde beaches and reaching the fort at the estuary of the Ave River. The Ecopista is a shared-use path, for bicycling and walking, 28 km long (18 of which in Póvoa de Varzim), linking Póvoa de Varzim and the inland town of Famalicão through the countryside and suburban areas. One of the main attractions on the Ecopista is the Romanesque Church in Rates and it grow throw flat terrain, despite crossing the hills of the countryside.

The City Park to the Coastal Area Bikeway started being built in November 2018 and it is mostly exclusive for bikes, except in areas where that is not possible, such as the area where it crosses the EN13 highway. The Via B Bikeway was built in 2018 and it goes throw the city's inland expansion area. The School Bikeway with 1.3 km between the school district and the Marginal Bikeway started being built in 2019.

== Notable people ==
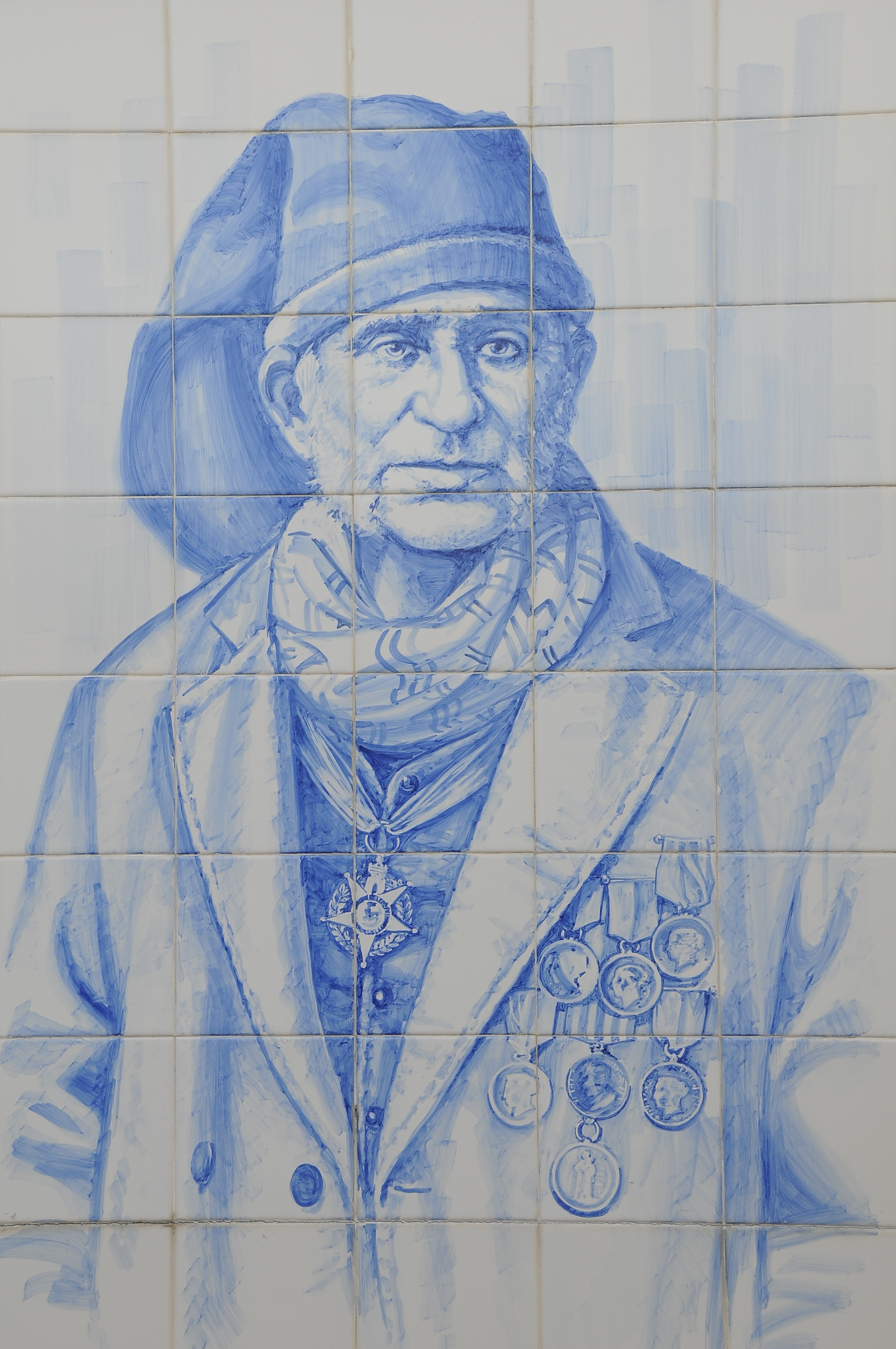
Cego do Maio

- Peter of Rates traditionally, the first bishop of Braga between AD45 and AD60.
- Saint Felix the Hermit a 9th-century fisherman and hermit
- Tomé de Sousa (1503–1579) the first governor-general of Brazil from 1549 to 1553.
- José Rodrigues Maio (1817–1884) commonly known as Cego do Maio a national hero, lifeguard and fisherman
- Francisco Gomes de Amorim (1827–1891) a Portuguese poet and dramatist
- Eça de Queiroz (1845–1900) a realist style Portuguese writer
- António dos Santos Graça (1882–1956) an ethnologist, journalist and politician; studied local culture, history and folklore.
- Josué Francisco Trocado (1882–1962) a Portuguese composer.
- Alexandrina of Balazar (1904–1955) known as Blessed Alexandrina of Balazar, was a mystic and victim soul
- Diogo Freitas do Amaral (1941–2019) a politician, law professor and Minister. He served briefly as Prime Minister in an interim capacity in the early 1980s.
- Tavares Moreira (1944–2020) an economist & governor of the Bank of Portugal (1986–1992)
- José Macedo Vieira (born 1949) the president of the city council of Póvoa de Varzim since 1993.

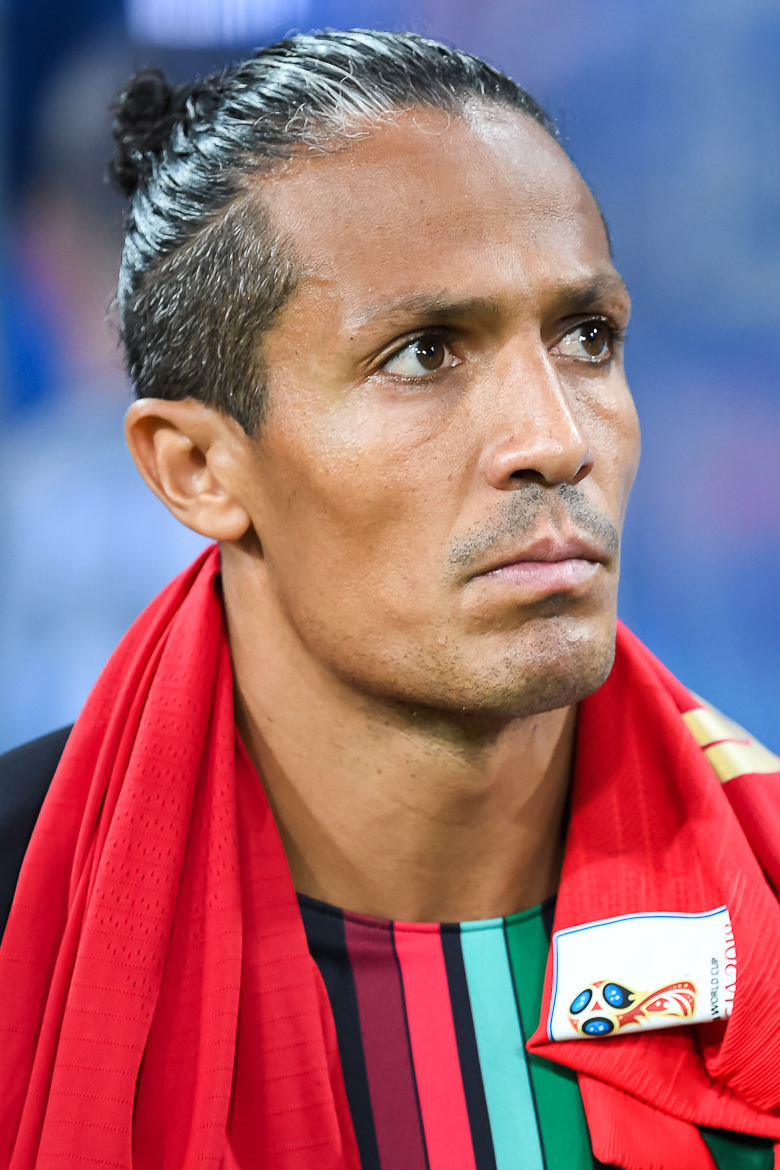
Bruno Alves, 2018

=== Sport ===
- António Lima Pereira (1952–2022) a footballer with 225 club caps and 20 for Portugal
- Manuel Albino Morim Maçães (born 1972), known as Bino, a former footballer with 329 club caps and 3 for Portugal
- Geraldo Alves (born 1980) a footballer with 392 club caps
- Bruno Alves (born 1981) a footballer with over 530 club caps and 96 for Portugal
- Carlos Milhazes (born 1981) a former footballer with 380 club caps
- Rui Costa (born 1986) a Portuguese professional road bicycle racer
- Adriano Niz (born 1986) a former freestyle swimmer, competed at the 2004 Summer Olympics
- Luís Neto (born 1988) a footballer with over 250 club caps and 19 for Portugal

== International relations ==
=== Atlantic Axis and European Regions ===
Póvoa de Varzim is part of the Eixo Atlântico ("Atlantic Axis"), a lobby of the most relevant Galician and Northern Portuguese cities. It also became a permanent member of the European Committee of the Regions, an assembly of local and regional representatives with a direct voice within the EU's institutional framework. In 2016, the regional government of Príncipe Island, an autonomous region of São Tomé and Príncipe, and the municipality of Póvoa de Varzim, established a cooperation protocol, which has diverse fields of cooperation using human and technical resources. The protocol was signed after a visit to Póvoa de Varzim by the president of Príncipe Province, José Cardoso Cassandra.

=== Twin towns – sister cities ===
Póvoa de Varzim is twinned with:

- Montgeron, France (1986)
- Eschborn, Germany (1988)

=== Partner cities ===
- Żabbar, Malta (2001)

== See also ==
- List of notable residents of Póvoa de Varzim
- Sculptures in Póvoa de Varzim
- Landmarks in Póvoa de Varzim
- Aguçadora Wave Park
