= Sports in Póvoa de Varzim =

Overview of sport in Póvoa de Varzim, Portugal

Póvoa de Varzim in Portugal has developed a number of sporting venues and has hosted several national, European and world championships in different sports. 38% of the population practise sport, a high rate when compared to the national average.

The most popular sport in Póvoa de Varzim is association football. The City Park's Stadium and synthetic fields for football practice and athletics are the main stage for Póvoa de Varzim's People's championship where its football clubs compete: Aguçadoura, Amorim, Argivai, Averomar, Balasar, Barreiros, Beiriz, Belém, Estela, Juve Norte, Laundos, Leões da Lapa, Mariadeira, Matriz, Navais, Rates, Regufe, Terroso, and Unidos ao Varzim. Varzim SC is the professional football club of the city which plays in its own stadium near the beach; as of 2007, it played in the Liga de Honra (2nd level), but several times has reached the Portuguese Liga.

Swimming is the second most practised sport. The International Meeting of Póvoa de Varzim, in long course pool, is part of the European winter calendar. The meeting occurs in the city pool complex belonging to Varzim Lazer, a municipal company that also runs other sports venues found north of the city: the tennis academy, the bullring, and the municipal pavilion. The other complex is property of Clube Desportivo da Póvoa, a club that is notorious, in the city, because it competes in several sports: rink hockey, volleyball, basketball, auto racing, and athletics. Other small clubs for other sports exist: Clube de Andebol da Póvoa de Varzim in Handball, Póvoa Futsal Club in Futsal and Póvoa de Varzim and Vila do Conde united clubs exists for Baseball and American football, Villas Vikings and Villas Titans, respectively. Beach volley and Footvolley are more popular sports, and it was in Póvoa that footvolley was, for the first time, practiced in Portugal.

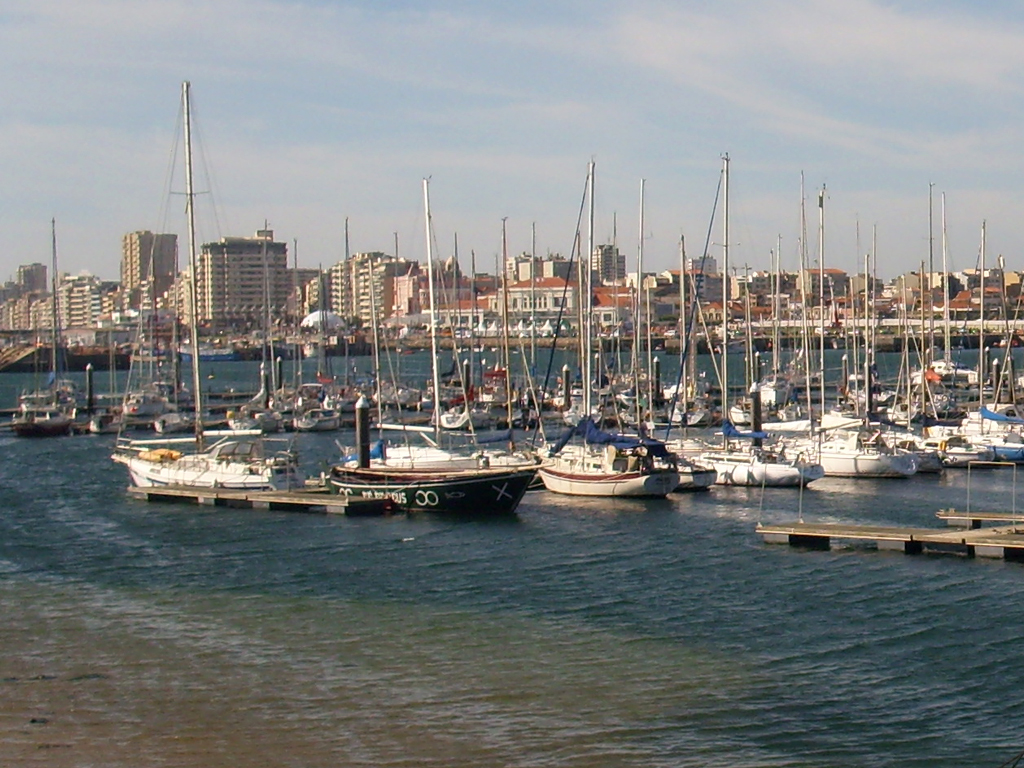
Póvoa Marina is a sheltered stop for boats that are exploring the west Iberian coast.

The Grande Prémio de São Pedro (Saint Peter Grand Prix), which occurs in the city's streets during the summer, is part of the national calendar of the Portuguese Athletics Federation. In 2007, the Grande Prémio da Marginal (Shoreline Grand Prix), an annual event between Póvoa de Varzim and Vila do Conde, aiming for the funding of the National Association of Paramiloidosis, was established in a bid to increase ties between both cities, as these share a common urban area. The Cego do Maio Half Marathon aims at the promotion of the city and the sport activity among the population. In cycling it hosts the Clássica da Primavera (Spring Classic) in April. The X BTT Cross Country Monte da Cividade and the newly created Grande Maratona Cidade da Póvoa de Varzim are the mountain biking activities occurring in the municipality.

The marina, near the seaport, offers sea activities developed by the local yacht club - the Clube Naval Povoense. Costa Verde Trophy, linking Póvoa and Viana do Castelo, is one of the regattas organized by the club and Rally Portugal yacht racing is a sailing and sightseeing event along the west Iberian coast. Near São Félix Hill, the São Pedro de Rates shooting camp is considered one of the best in Portugal and in Europe, prestigious among nationals. There is also a links golf course and a greyhound racing track in Estela.

Due to its geography and suitable urban areas, board culture is omnipresent in Póvoa de Varzim. Bodyboarders and surfers meet at Salgueira Beach. In Lota, a recreation area for several audiences, is especially popular amongst the skater and biker communities, and is considered the most charismatic skater area in the country.
