= Demographics of Póvoa de Varzim =

Historical population
Year	Pop.	±%
1720	1,396	—
1736	1,796	+28.7%
1750	2,184	+21.6%
1768	3,360	+53.8%
1780	3,776	+12.4%
1795	4,328	+14.6%
1801	4,676	+8.0%
1821	5,672	+21.3%
1830	6,097	+7.5%
1836	8,036	+31.8%
1849	15,300	+90.4%
1864	18,704	+22.2%
1878	20,578	+10.0%
1890	23,372	+13.6%
1900	24,527	+4.9%
1911	25,083	+2.3%
1920	25,929	+3.4%
1930	28,780	+11.0%
1940	31,693	+10.1%
1950	37,938	+19.7%
1960	40,444	+6.6%
1970	42,698	+5.6%
1981	54,248	+27.1%
1991	54,788	+1.0%
2001	63,470	+15.8%
2011	63,408	−0.1%
Before 1849, data refers only to Póvoa de Varzim Parish (N.S. Conceição). 1720–1836 Sources: 1864–2001,

A native of Póvoa de Varzim in Portugal is called a Poveiro which can be rendered into English as Povoan. According to the 2001 Census, there were 63,470 inhabitants that year, 38 848 (61.2%) of whom lived in the city. The number goes up to 100,000 if adjacent satellite areas are taken into account, ranking it as the seventh largest independent urban area in Portugal, within a polycentric agglomeration of about 3 million people, ranging from Braga to Porto.

The urban area has a population density of 3,035 people/km^{2} (7,860 people/sq mi), while the rural and suburban areas have a density of 355.5/km^{2} (921/sq mi). The rural areas away from the city tend to be scarcely populated, becoming denser near it. During the summer the resident population in the city triples; this seasonal movement from neighbouring cities is due to the draw of the beach and 29.9% of homes had seasonal use in 2001, the highest in Greater Porto. Póvoa de Varzim is the youngest city in the region with a birth rate of 13.665 and mortality rate of 8.330. Unlike other urban areas of greater Porto, it is not a satellite city. Significant commuting occurs only with Vila do Conde, an urban expansion area of Póvoa since the 18th century.

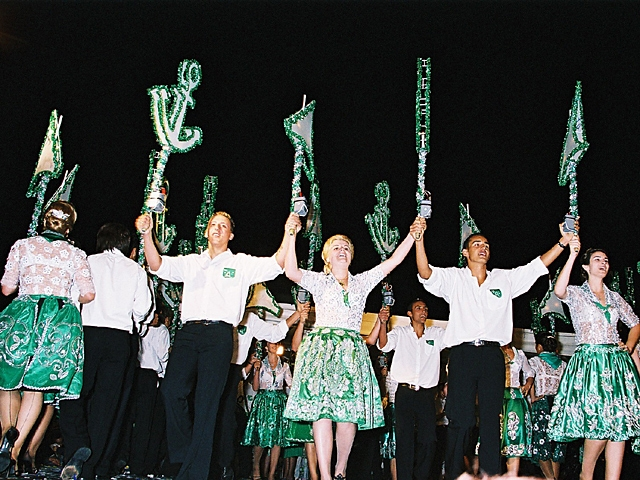
Poveiros during the 2006 Saint Peter festival.

For centuries a fishing community of mostly Norman origin, where ethnic isolationism was a common practice, Póvoa de Varzim is today a cosmopolitan town, with people originating from the Ave Valley who settled in the coastal Northern districts during the 20th century, the ancient immigration from Galicia, Portuguese-Africans (who arrived in significant numbers after the independence of Angola and Mozambique) in the late 1970s and people of diverse nationalities, the biggest immigrant communities are Ukrainians, Brazilians, Chinese, Russians, and Angolans.

The population of the entire municipality grew only 1% between 1981 and 1991, then increased by 15.3% between 1991 and 2001. During that period, the urban population had grown 23%, with the number of families increasing considerably — by about 44.5%. In 2005 Expresso considered it as the most developed in Porto district and Primeiro de Janeiro as the "city of future" in the Porto district, the quality of living, the infrastructure development such as the light rail metro and a 15 minutes distance from Porto and Braga, prompted new residents originating from near-by cities such as Guimarães, Famalicão, Braga and Porto which led to a real estate development that may double the resident population in the medium term.

Due to the practice of endogamy and the caste system, Póvoa's fishing community maintained local ethnic characteristics. Anthropological and cultural data indicate Nordic fishermen settling during the period of the coast's resettlement. In As Praias de Portugal (Beaches of Portugal, 1876), Ramalho ortigão wrote that the Povoan fishermen were a "race" in the Portuguese coast; entirely different from the Mediterranean type of Ovar and Olhão, Poveiro is of "Saxon" type. On the other hand, the man from the interior was a farmer with Galician character (Paleo and Nordid-Atlantid). In a 1908 research, anthropologist Fonseca Cardoso considered that Poveiros were the result of a mixture of Phoenicians, Teutons, Jews and, mostly, Normans. In the book The Races of Europe (1938), Poveiros were distinguished by having a greater than usual degree of blondism, broad faces of unknown origin, and broad jaws.

Poveiros have migrated to other places and this attenuated the population growth. One should notice that the Poveiros tended to create their own associations abroad, there are Casa dos Poveiros (Poveiros House) in Brazil (Rio de Janeiro and São Paulo), Germiston in South Africa and Toronto in Canada. In Rio de Janeiro, the community was known by not wanting other peoples of other origins, including Portuguese born in other regions, within their community. In 1920, many Poveiros emigrated in Brazil returned, as many refused to lose Portuguese nationality. The governor of Angola, with an ambition to develop fisheries, suggested the creation of a Povoan colony in Porto Alexandre. Due to fisher classes affairs, the fisher areas of Vila do Conde, Esposende and Matosinhos have strong Povoan cultural influence and half of the population of Vila do Conde and Matosinhos are of Povoan descent.
