= Farol da Lapa =

Lighthouse in Portugal

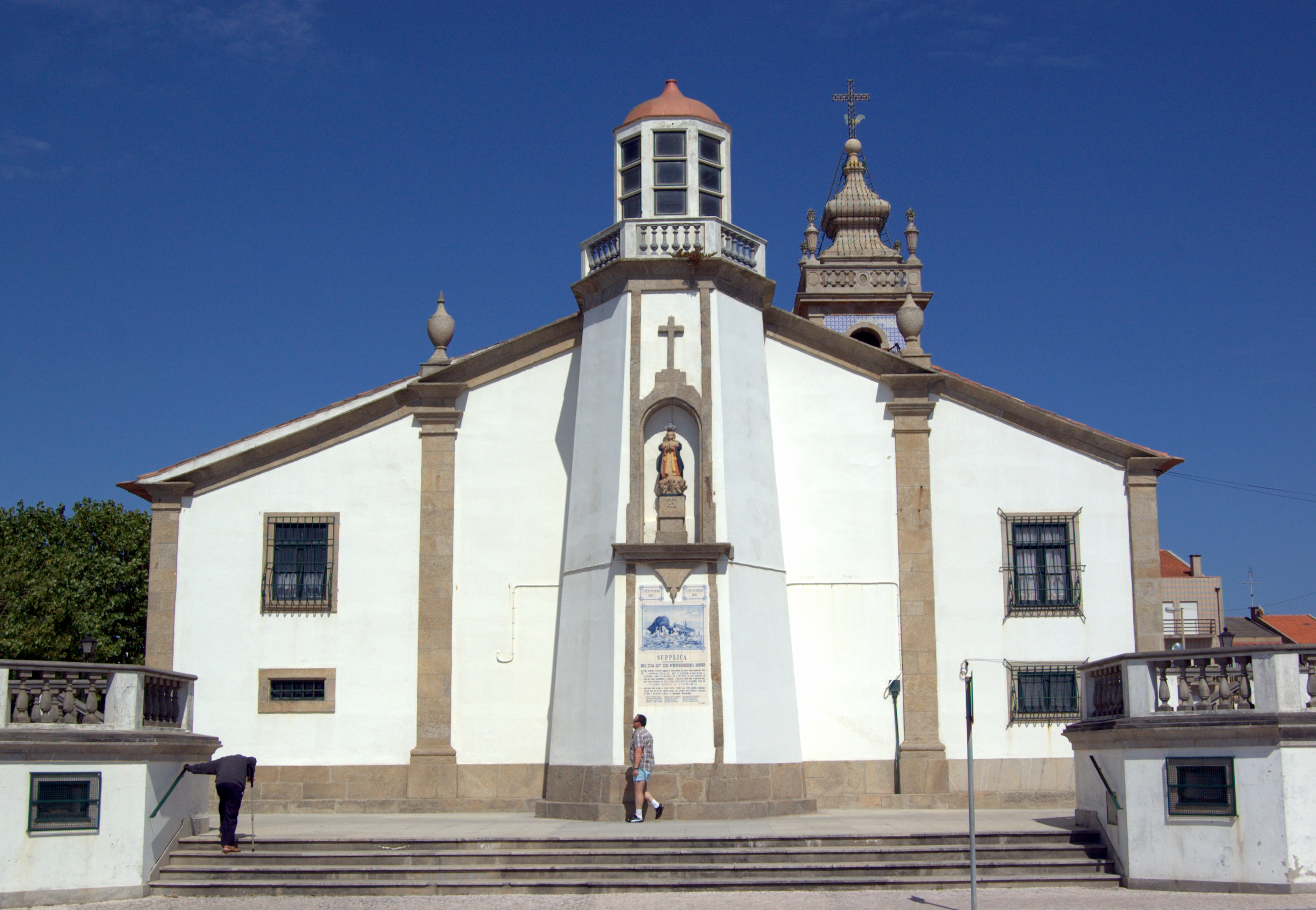
- Lapa Lighthouse
- Location: Póvoa de Varzim; Portugal
- Coordinates: 41.373796°N 8.761595°W

Tower
- Constructed: 1857
- Construction: stone tower attached to the back of the church Nossa Senhora de Lapa

Light
- Deactivated: 1960s

Farol da Lapa (Portuguese for Lighthouse of (the) Lapa) is a lighthouse in Póvoa de Varzim, Portugal, on the seaport of Póvoa de Varzim in Póvoa Bay.

== History ==
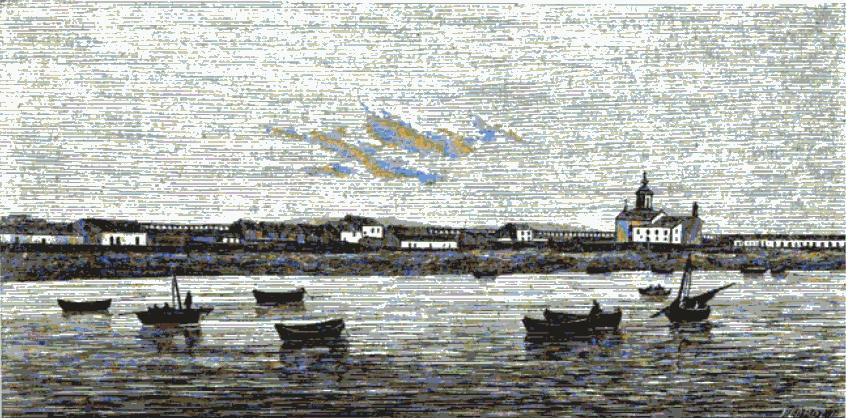
Lapa Lighthouse and temple as seen from Póvoa Bay around 1868

The first historical reference to the town's light (sinal da Vila) is from the 16th century. The light was located in the current location, named "Lugar do Facho" (literally, place of the lighthouse), where the Lapa Church was built in 1770. In May 1833, the Castelo da Póvoa Alferes asked for help, to the city hall, to keep the town's light for six nights. During the Portuguese Civil War (1828–1834), the light was located in the fortress.

The light's current location, in Lapa Church, then named Facho da Atalaia da Ordenança, was over an iron structure, according to old listings of lighthouses and pictures from old postcards. This early version was a kind of crane tower located in Lapa churchyard, and assured the alignment that indicated the correct path ships should use to pass the sandbank in security.

Still in the 19th century, the current lighthouse was constructed as part of the temple by the Royal Brotherhood of Nossa Senhora da Assunção due to the great devotion Povoan fishermen had over this small temple. It served as a guide for seafarers, but in a special way to fishermen.

In 1892 the lighthouse became the first light of the Lapa-Regufe alignment of Póvoa Bay slope. By getting the alignment between the two points of light of Farol da Lapa and Farol de Regufe, known as enfiamento, the fishermen knew that the boat was in the strait corridor between underwater rocks and it was safe to cross the sandbank where numerous fishermen lost their lives in the course of several generations. The lighthouse was activated when the crossing of the sandbank became dangerous due to sea levels or storms.

In the 1960s it was deactivated, probably due to the construction of the new breakwaters as the alignment became inappropriate

It was recovered and reactivated in August 2016, along with the church. The lighthouse can be visited using a door which existed in the 17th century, but it was covered for unknown reasons. The door is now used to get into the lighthouse. It has uneven stony steps and it can be used for sightseeing.

== See also ==
- List of lighthouses in Portugal
