= Casa dos Poveiros =

Casa dos Poveiros (Home or House of Povoans) is the name given to regionalist voluntary associations of Portuguese settlers or immigrants from Póvoa de Varzim, for community meeting and the promotion of the culture of Póvoa de Varzim.

The establishment of a proper association apart from other Portuguese associations was due to regional cultural differences. Casa dos Poveiros included people from the municipalities of Póvoa de Varzim, but also related or derived communities from the municipalities of Vila do Conde and Esposende.

== History ==
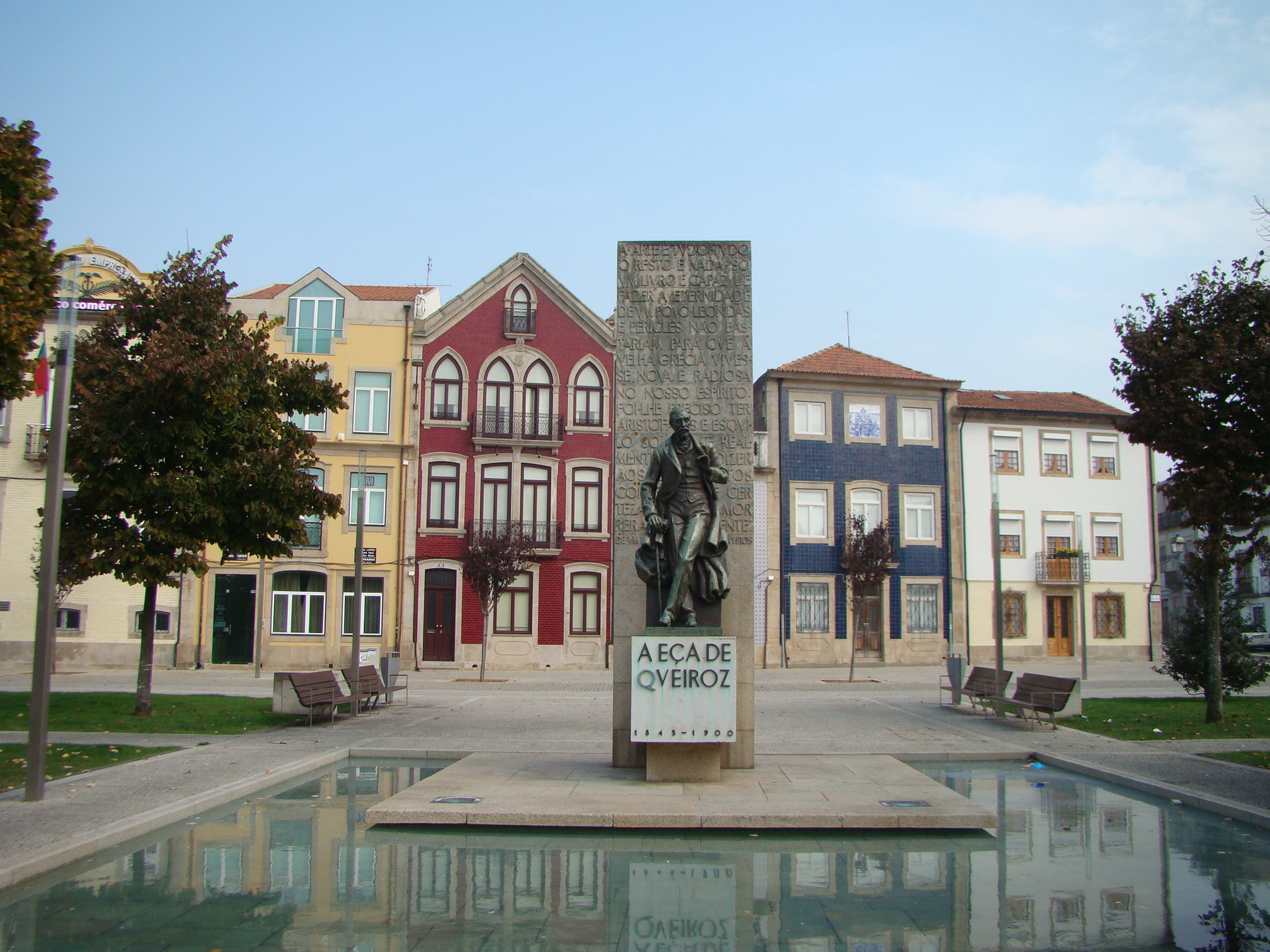
the statue of Eça de Queiroz in Póvoa de Varzim was offered by Povoans of Brazil

One of the earliest and most influential Casa dos Poveiros, from which the naming comes from, was founded in Rio de Janeiro, Brazil in 1930. The Casa dos Poveiros of Rio actively lobbied for the artifialization works on the Port of Póvoa de Varzim during the Estado Novo regime in Portugal and their actions were seen as fundamental for that 200-year-old cause of the city. Another group with actively worked, was Grupo Pró-Póvoa, which lasted until 1931, was founded in Manaus, Amazonas for the establishment of Casa do Operário Poveiro (currently A Filantrópica) in Póvoa de Varzim.

In the 1950s, the Casa dos Poveiros of Lourenço Marques (Maputo) and Beira in Mozambique were established. With the independence of the former Portuguese overseas provinces of Africa and consequent movement of Povoans to South Africa, the Casa dos Poveiros of Germiston (Johannesburg) was established. More recently, Casa dos Poveiros were established in Toronto in 1986 and São Paulo in 1991.

=== Locations ===
- Brazil Rio de Janeiro
- Brazil São Paulo
- South Africa Germiston, Johannesburg
- Canada Toronto

former locations:

- Brazil Manaus
- Mozambique Lourenço Marques (modern Maputo)
- Mozambique Beira
