= Castelo da Póvoa =

Coordinates: 41.3780°N 8.7642°W

Castle of Póvoa
- Castelo de Póvoa
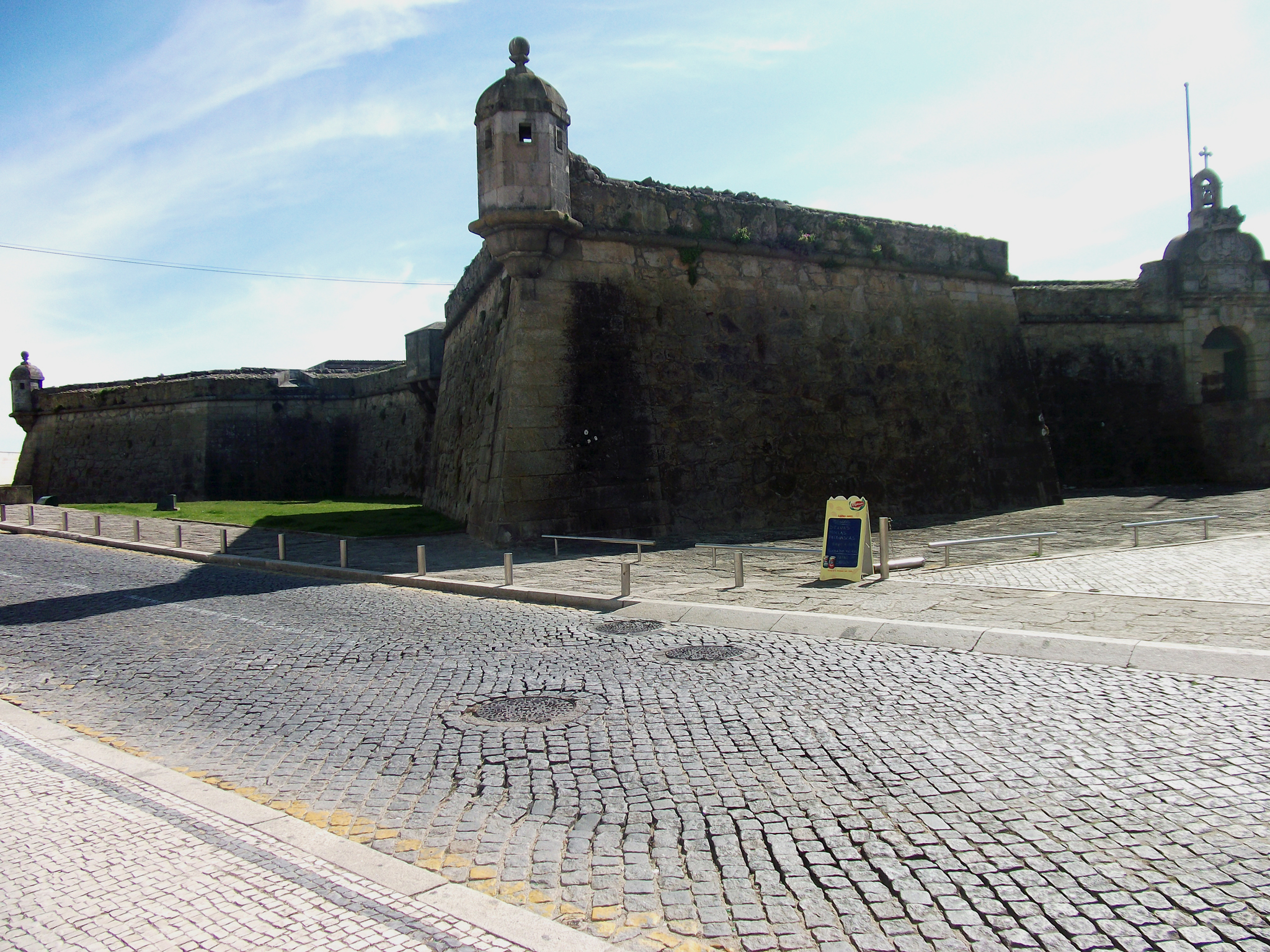

General information
- Location: Povoa, Portugal
- Completed: Reign of John I of Portugal
- Owner: Republic of Portugal

The Castelo da Póvoa (English: Castle of Póvoa), also Fortress of Póvoa de Varzim, officially Fortaleza da Nossa Senhora da Conceição or Nossa Senhora da Conceição Fortress, is a Portuguese fortress in Póvoa de Varzim rebuilt during the reigns of Peter II and John V (between 1701 and 1740) to defend the town from privateers, in the site of an earlier fort known as "Forte de Torrão". It is considered a listed property of Public Interest in Portugal.

== History ==
=== Early fort ===
Pinho Leal, in the book Portugal Antigo e Moderno (1876) stated that it is supposed that a small and ancient fort, named Forte de Torrão, was built in the 15th century, during the reign of John I of Portugal. In the end of the 16th century, the shipbuilding industry started developing in the area of Ribeira, a shipyard located around the fort.

The fortification was financed by Póvoa de Varzim Town Hall, and had as main goal to protect the local merchant community from privateer attacks. This early fort, that still existed in 1685, was garnished by a lieutenant, a condestável and two artillerymen, nominated by the town hall.

=== 18th-century fortress ===
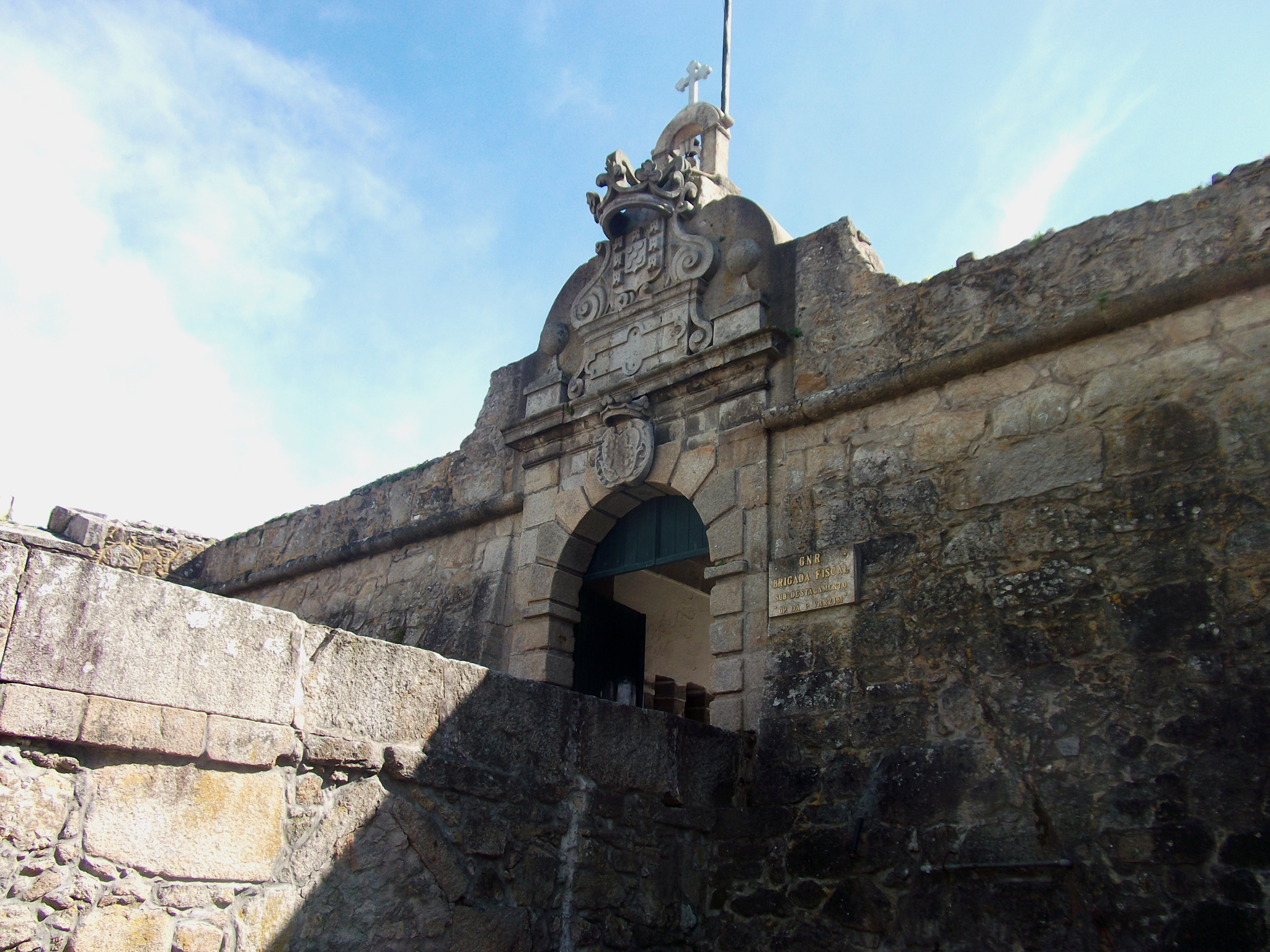
The gate of the fortress prior to the recovery of the historical removable wooden bridge.

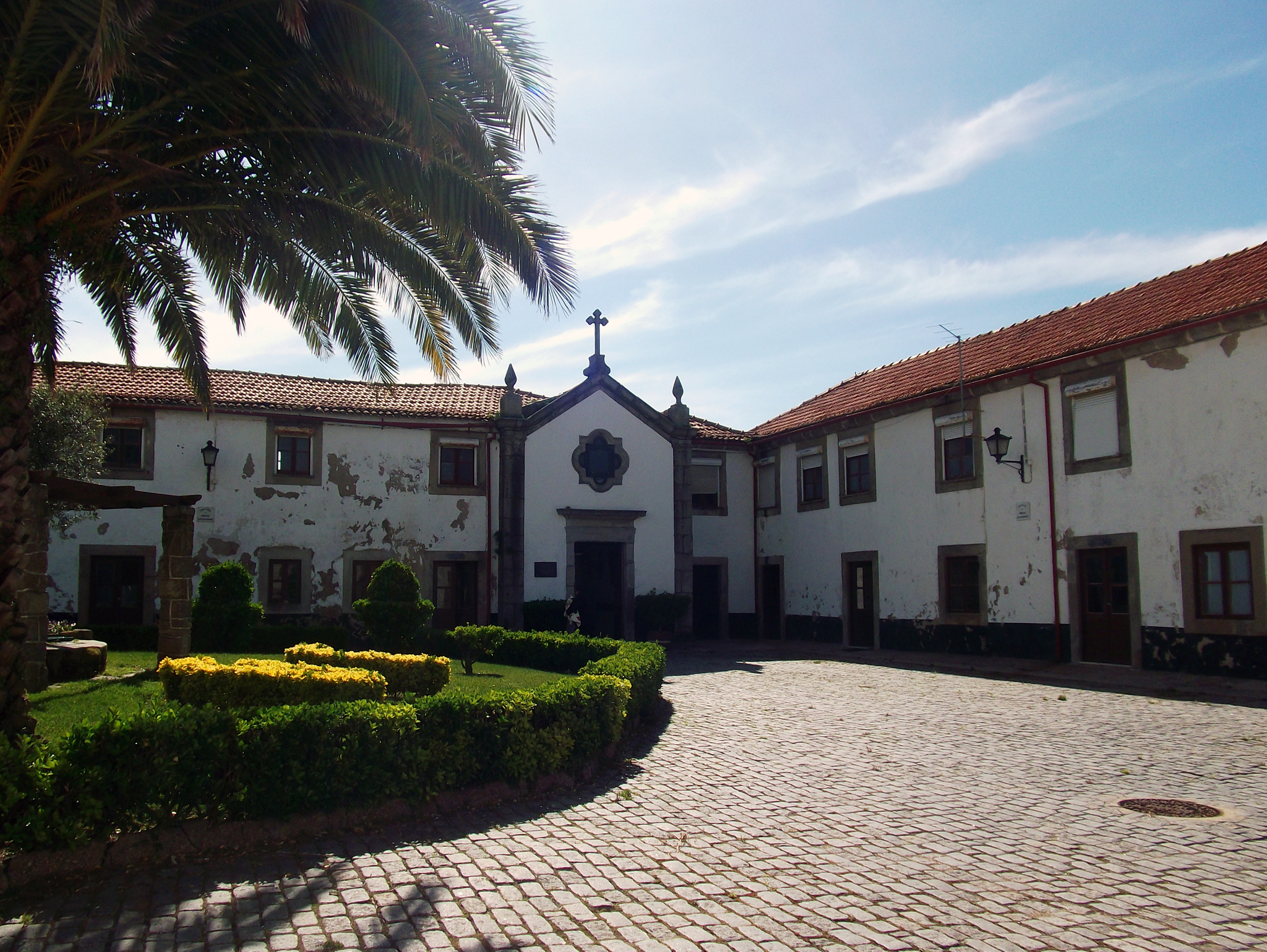
The chapel in the elevated ground level before the renovation project.

In the end of the 17th century, during the Age of Gunpowder, with the urge for a better defense of the seaport, the alcaide (governor of the fort) João de Almeira Rêgo thought that the construction of a new fortress would be preferable.

Construction began in 1701, during the reign of Peter II of Portugal. Works halted in 1703 due to lack of funding. Several years later, John V of Portugal, unaware of the situation, was informed that the port of Póvoa de Varzim had no security as construction works stopped in the fortress for several years.

Works resumed in 1738 when Sir Diogo de Sousa, sun of Sir João de Sousa, Governor of Arms of Minho province, received orders from the king to complete the fortress. These order were dispatched because the king considered that this coastal fortification was of great importance for the kingdom. As Sir Diogo de Sousa was the governor to complete the fortress in 1740, his family crest were placed over the gate on 22 October that year, the day of the monarch's anniversary.

== Architecture ==
The fortress is a star fortification with a quadrangular shape with four bastions in each end; two facing the sea (Conceição and São Francisco de Bórgia bastions), and two facing the land (São José and São Filipe e Diogo bastions). Over the flanks of the first two bastions two groups of walls, 33 metres high, join in with a sharp angle facing the sea, forming a group with 7 metres high and extending for 60 meters. It is an architectural project by the sergeant major and engineer Sebastião de Souza.

At the ground level of the fortress, there's a chapel dedicated to Our Lady of the Immaculate Conception, today known as Capela de Nossa Senhora da Conceição do Castelo (Castle's Chapel of Our Lady of Conception), it was known as Royal Chapel (Capela Real) and was built in 1733. A brotherhood was established in there by the Jesuits that, in certain periods, had over 2,000 brothers, mostly from Póvoa and surrounding lands. It was extinct by King Joseph of Portugal in 1761, when the king expelled the company from Portugal. From the fortress a traditional Corpus Christi procession was known, a gun salute occurred when leaving the fortress throw the gate.

The chapel has a Baroque style and is very small, covered by a stonework vault covered in gilded woodcarving and tabernacle. Saint Barbara, patron saint of artillery, and an image of baby Jesus with the heart in hand, patron of the ancient Jesuit congregation, are venerated in there.

During the Peninsular War and under the grand strategy Napoleon drafted, which included the invasion of Portugal using the corps of French Marshal Jean-de-Dieu Soult, the fortress of Póvoa de Varzim and that of Vila do Conde, in close proximity, were taken by French troops in late March 1809, as there were few troops in the region. The French control of the towns of Póvoa de Varzim and Vila do Conde lasted for almost two months. In May, Soult retreated throw the Marão and Gerês massifs, escaping the Anglo-Portuguese forces.

It lost military importance in the 19th century and became a Guarda Fiscal barracks for much of the 20th century. In 2016 and under Póvoa de Varzim City Hall administration, the fortress was "recovered" which included some contemporary architectural aspects in interiors, with a bar occupied the whole structure.

For that summer it became a popular open air nightclub, however the circumstances of the monument were controversial to local society. Pressured, Póvoa de Varzim City Hall state it will not allow the nightclub for the next summer, and promised a diversified leisure use for the fortress.[6]
