= Reinaldo Oudinot =

French engineer

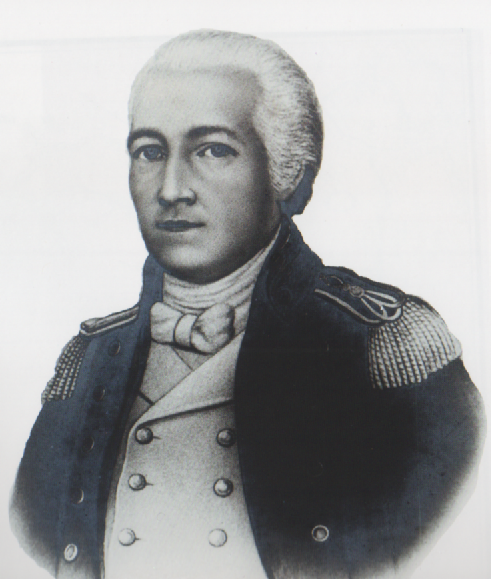
- Reinaldo Oudinot
- Born: 1744; Sampigny, Diocese of Verdun, France
- Died: 11 February 1807 (aged 62–63) Funchal, Madeira Island
- Rank: Brigadier of Royal Engineers

Reinaldo Oudinot (English: /uːdiːˈnoʊ/ oo-dee-NOH, French: [ʁeinaldo udino]), or Renauld Oudinot, was a French military engineer from the 18th century, who became most famous for his hydraulic works on the Portuguese harbours of Porto, Aveiro, Leiria and Funchal. Even though he was born and educated in France, he started his career in Portugal, where he developed several projects on different fields such as: architecture, urban planning, hydraulic engineering and agriculture development. In 1803, he was to become one of the most ranked engineers on the Portuguese army as he was promoted to Brigadier of the Royal Engineers.

== First years ==
Reinaldo Oudinot was born in 1744 in Sampigny on the diocese of Verdun in France. It has been written that after finishing his degree in engineering he travelled to England, arriving in Portugal in 1766. On 5 September he signed in the Portuguese Army, beginning his military career with the post of infantry helper. In his first years he worked at the Province of Estremadura where Later in 1768 he joined the team of Gilherme Elsden on the surveys for Tejo, upgrading to Infantry Officer on 8 February.

== Leiria (1773-87) ==
In 1773 Reinaldo Oudinot was nominated to be the head-director of the Hydraulic works in the Lis River in Leiria. During this assignment, he developed several surveys of the Pinhal de Leiria. The project developed by Oudinot to the Lis river had two stages: the first, consisted of the regularization of the river channel through the cleaning of the sands and the establishment of the river into a straight line; the second, consisted of the construction of a floodwall to prevent future floods to happen over the lands in the south. During these improvements on the harbour, the consort king D. Pedro III, heir of these lands, valued the work of Oudinot, allowing him to expand his ideas for the harbour in 1778. In 1787, after the death of D. Pedro, the succeeding prince D. João ordered an inspection on the hydraulic works made on the Lis River. This inspection resulted in a new project proposal by sergeant major Manuel Caetano de Sousa, who contested the hydraulic project of Reinaldo Oudinot. These actions cause Oudinot to be removed from the direction of the harbour. Although the presence of Reinaldo Oudinot was no longer required in Leiria, a short time later he was assigned to work on Porto, to open and clean the harbour of Douro River. During this time, he developed an astonishing amount of work that extended to architecture design and urban planning.

== Porto (1789-1804) ==
After staying 15 years in Leiria, Reinaldo Oudinot was nominated to travel to Porto to examine the harbour of Douro River. He arrived in October 1789, with the instructions made by the minister José Seabra da Silva. These instructions provided him information about the site and which points to work on the harbour. One month later, Oudinot sent to José Seabra da Silva, a plan with the project to be made. In this plan he answers the demands by making a dyke on the north side of the harbour, on the river mouth, which connected the lighthouse S. Miguel-o-Anjo to the Fort of S. João Baptista. The idea was to allow the regular movement of the waters oriented by the dyke to dredge up the silt from Douro. The project was approved and in February 1790 the Queen D. Maria I ordered the beginning of the procedures. The Infantry Officer Faustino Salustiano da Costa e Sá was nominated to be Oudinot's assistant. Five days after the approval, the Queen demanded the construction of two military barracks for the troops in Porto, Saint Ovídio and Casa Pia. This assignment was also given to Oudinot.

From 1789 to 1804, Oudinot presented several projects that consisted not just of the opening and cleaning of the harbour but also of the redesigning of Douro's riverfront. This urban project for the riverfront of Douro consisted of the development of five places: São João da Foz, Massarelos, Ribeira do Porto, Guindais and Freixo. Along with these improvements, Oudinot also proposed the construction of a seaside road connecting these five points, providing distribution and harmony to this urban plan.

In his plan for the riverfront from 1791, Reinaldo Oudinot combined the three most important aspects for development: hydraulic, urban and military. By expanding the Fort of S. João Baptista and designing a new urban structure of regular blocks and squares, Oudinot completely restructured the river mouth of Douro. Even though this project wasn't built due to insufficient funds, the ideologies used by Marques de Pombal in the Downtown of Lisbon are clearly visible on this plan.

== Póvoa de Varzim (1791) ==
Throughout the year 1789, Reinaldo was designated to travel to the town of Póvoa de Varzim (30 km north of Porto) to study the conditions of the site and later develop an urban project for the village. The project's main goal was to improve the village infrastructure with the development of three constructions: the transportation of water to the centre of the village by making a new aqueduct; the second, the design of a Central Square for the village, a place for commercial activities and social gathering (this project-square would be accompanied with the construction of the village's City hall and Market); and third, the construction of a Port so the fishing boats could safely anchorage in difficult weather. On the 26th of 1791, Reinaldo Oudinot completed the project, mailing the plans and budget to the Minister José Seabra da Silva. The strategies developed by Oudinot to Póvoa de Varzim helped the village establish a political and social centre, thanks to the square. This square (later named as Praça de Almada), was designed as a rectangular space, connecting the two main communities at the time, the historic centre, on the countryside, and the fishing community on the seaside.

All these projects were made during this 15-year period where he worked for the Government of Porto. In 1801, in an early stage of the War of the Oranges, Reinaldo Oudinot took charge as Governor of the Troops of Porto replacing João Correia de Sá, who died that same year.

== Aveiro (1802-04) ==
During his work in Porto, Reinaldo Oudinot and his assistant and son-in-law Luis Gomes de Carvalho were nominated to work on the Vouga river in Aveiro in 1802. This assignment also had the purpose of developing the harbour and opening of the river mouth. For two years, Reinaldo Oudinot and his partner presented different projects and solutions for the harbour, being only constructed the dyke for the Lagoon. Due to the floods happening in Madeira Island in the beginning of 1804, Oudinot left Aveiro, leaving the works on the Lagoon in the hands of Luis Gomes de Carvalho. This construction later revealed to be a success in 1808. A 'Jardim Oudinot' public park is a testimony of this work, along the Ria da Costa Nova in the Nazaré district of Aveiro, Portugal.

== Madeira (1804-07) ==
After the great floods in Madeira Island in 1803, Reinaldo Oudinot was designated to work in the reconstruction of Funchal. For this assignment he was elevated to brigadier of the Royal Engineers. In his first months spent on the island, he developed a strategy for the reconstruction of the riversides of Funchal, which was presented in April 1804. Some time later, he presented a plan showing the state of the city after the floods of 1803. In this plan Oudinot proposed an urban expansion of Funchal to the West, which he called "The New City to Build". This plan was never constructed, however, according to researchers, it might have had a major influence on the development of Funchal. In 1805, Oudinot presents a new plan for the city, signed by his assistant Capitan Feliciano de Mattos de Carvalho. Later in 1806, his constructions would successfully sustain the floods. Reinaldo Oudinot later died on 11 February 1807 in Funchal. Even though he stayed in Madeira Island only three years, he developed an astonishing amount of work that played a major role on the reconstruction of the city of Funchal, after the great floods of 9 October 1803.

== Personal life ==
Reinaldo Oudinot was first married to Dª Maria Vicência de Mengui in France. They had only one daughter, Dª Maria Paula Oudinot who married Luis Gomes de Carvalho, a military engineer who later became Oudinot's assistant and follower on the harbour of Aveiro. After his wife death, he remarried in 1802 to Dª Vicencia do Carmo Locatelli, daughter of the Italian João Batista Locatelli. They had three children, João Reinaldo, Maria Augusta and Thereza Josephina. The Oudinot's family were established in Aveiro and Leiria for many years, and can still be found descendants. It has been written that Reinaldo Oudinot is brother of Nicolas-Charles Oudinot, Duke of Reggio and Marshal of France.

== Military Ranks and Cities ==
- Infantry Helper (3 September 1766) - Province of Estremadura
- Infantry Officer (29 December 1767) - River Tejo / Leiria
- Sergeant Major (20 March 1780) - Leiria
- Lieutenant Colonel (22 November 1784) - Leiria / Porto / Póvoa de Varzim
- Colonel of the Royal Engineers (12 December 1791) - Porto / S. Martinho do Porto / Aveiro
- Governor of the Troops of Porto (4 January 1801, after the death of the Governor D. João Correia de Sá)
- Brigadier of the Royal Engineers (14 December 1803) - Funchal
