= Farol de Regufe =

Farol de Regufe Póvoa de Varzim Range Rear
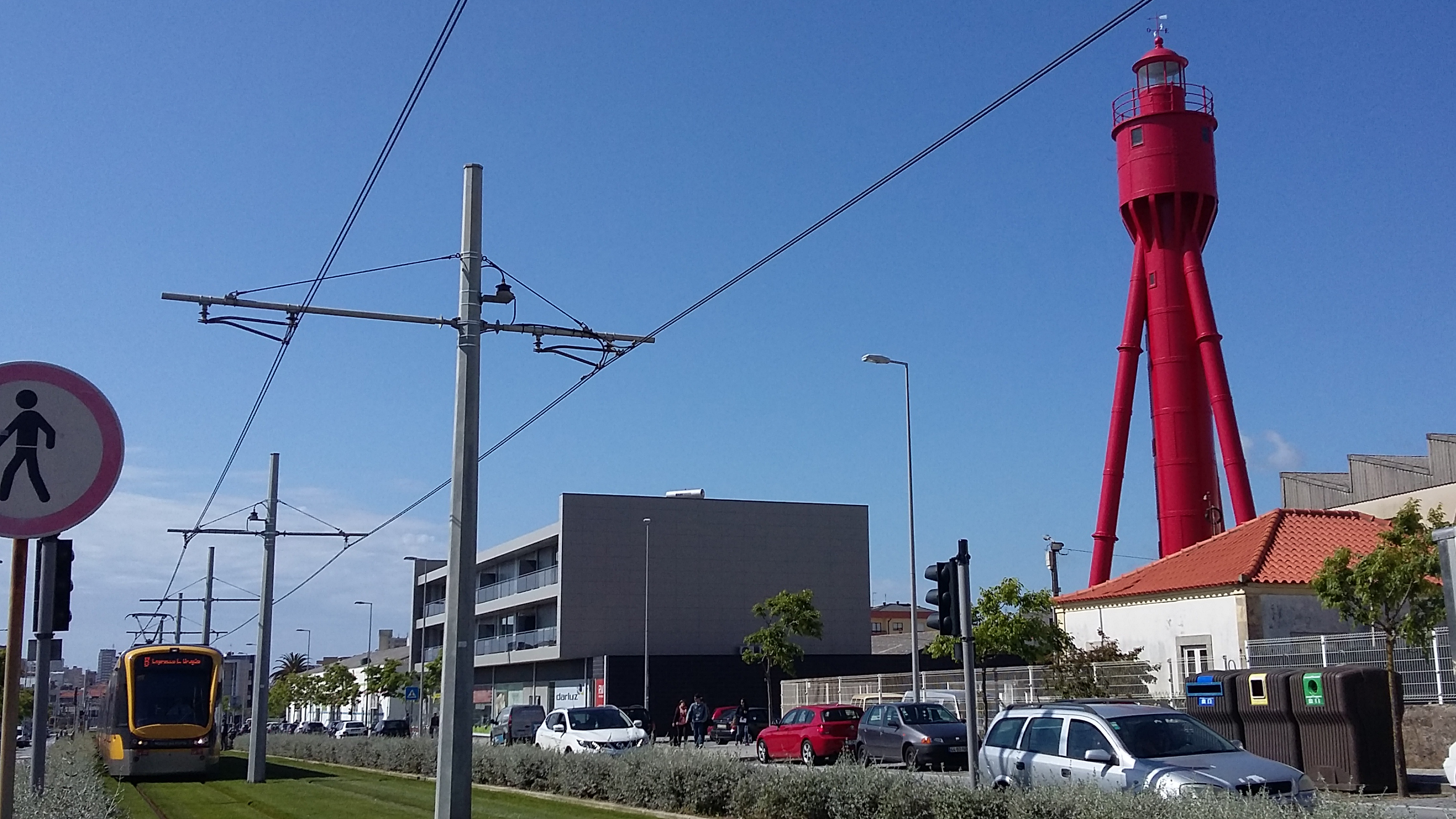
- Location: Póvoa de Varzim; Portugal
- Coordinates: 41.374387°N 8.754706°W

Tower
- Constructed: 1886
- Construction: cast iron tower
- Automated: 1976
- Height: 22 metres (72 ft)
- Shape: tripod tower with central cylinder
- Markings: red tower and lantern
- Heritage: heritage without legal protection

Light
- Deactivated: 2001
- Focal height: 30 m (98 ft)
- Lens: 5th Order 187.5mm
- Intensity: 500 W
- Range: 15 nautical miles (28 km; 17 mi)
- Characteristic: Iso W 6s.

Farol de Regufe or Regufe Light is a lighthouse in Póvoa de Varzim, Portugal, located in the city neighborhood of Regufe, origin of the lighthouse's naming.

== History ==
It is known that the construction of Farol de Regufe, also occasionally named São Brás Light (Farol de São Brás) is from 1885 to 1886, but its origins and who designed the project are unknown. It was inaugurated, years later, on March 24, 1892.

It is one of the lighthouses representing the iron art in Northern Portugal. The cylindrical tower, painted in red, is 22 meters in height, supported by three iron braces or anchors. The lighthouse's design is unique, although there are another two iron tripods in Argentina in Cape San Antonio and Punta Médanos.

Farol de Regufe served, along with Farol da Lapa, the alignment of the slop in Póvoa Bay. In 1917 a house was constructed near the lighthouse, where, in 1929, Flávio Gonçalves, sun of the keeper, was born. Flávio Gonçalves was a notable historian of Portuguese art.

The lighthouse was restored in 1995. In December 2001 it was deactivated with the Seafarers Warning Aviso Aos Navegantes nº 25 of December 7, 2001. During the years, the lighthouse became the symbol of Regufe neighborhood, a traditional quarter of the city and one of the six participating neighborhoods in São Pedro Festival, the city's holiday, as such the local population opposed intentions to transfer the lighthouse to another location, because it was no longer needed in there. The lighthouse was reactivated on the evening of April 23, 2015 and, in 2016, the city hall signed a protocol with the Portuguese navy for a lighthouse keeper, as the museum of Póvoa de Varzim has planned tours for visitors, and can be used for sightseeing, as it is part of the city's cultural and historical landmarks.

== Gallery ==
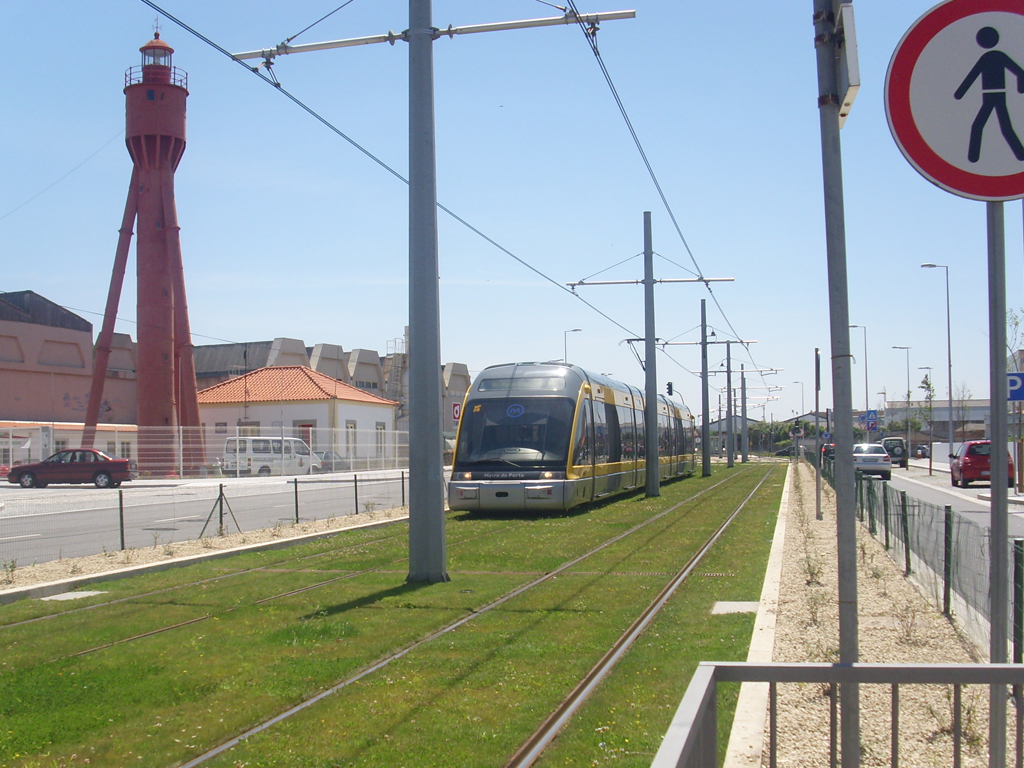
Regufe Lighthouse in 2008, after being deactivated.

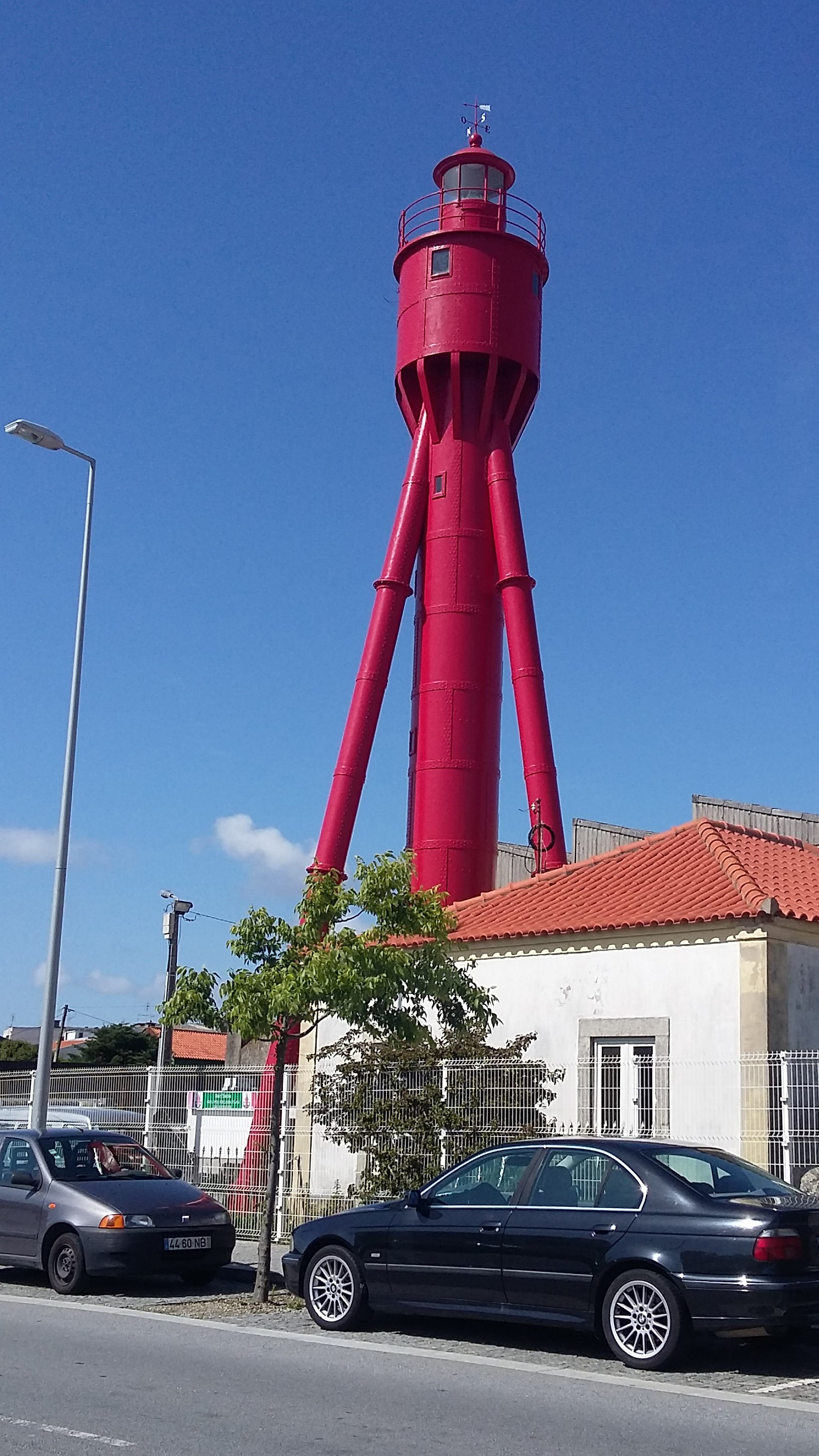
Refuge Lighthouse after restoration in 2016.

== See also ==
- List of lighthouses in Portugal
