= Póvoa de Varzim City Hall =

Coordinates: 41.3796°N 8.7600°W

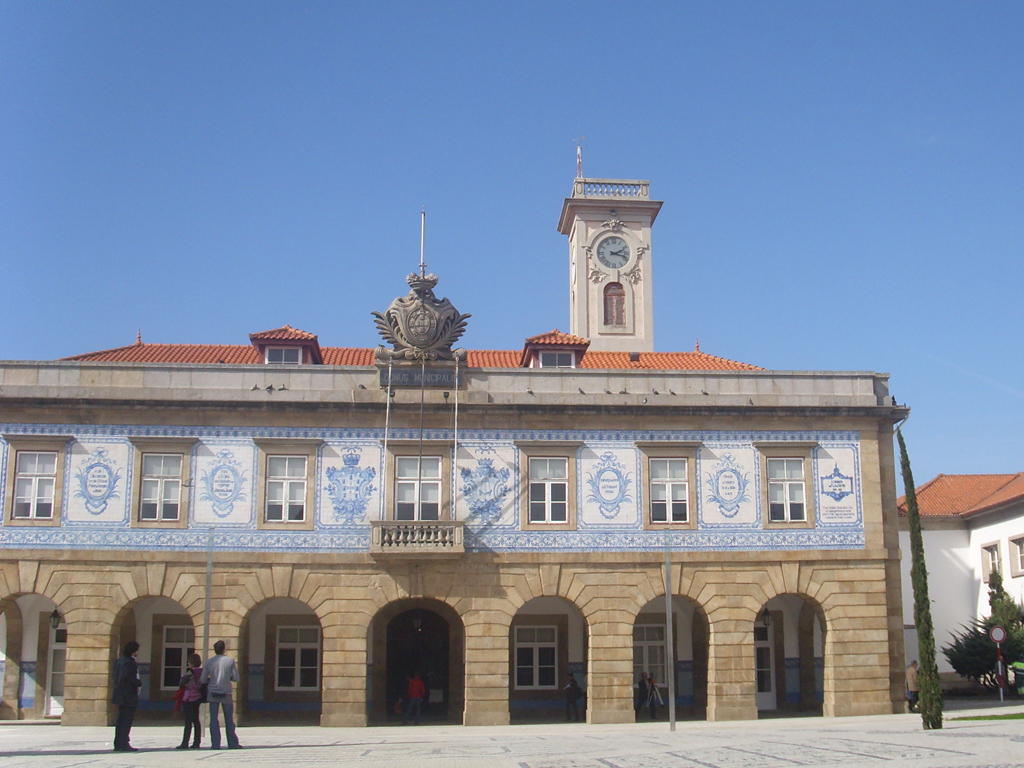
Póvoa de Varzim City Hall.

Póvoa de Varzim City Hall (Portuguese: Câmara Municipal da Póvoa de Varzim) is the seat of government of the municipality of Póvoa de Varzim, Portugal. It houses the office of the mayor of Povoa de Varzim, the city council chamber, as well as other city services.

The current building was designed by Reinald Oudinot in late 18th-century Neoclassical style and is located at Praça do Almada square in Póvoa de Varzim City Center. Póvoa's original town hall is located at Praça Velha, the late medieval core of the municipality of Póvoa de Varzim.

== History ==
Póvoa de Varzim City Hall was part of the project for the urban rearrangement of Póvoa de Varzim in late 18th century aiming to build a new civic center and replacing an earlier town hall, during the reign of Queen Maria I.

The project was delivered by the shire's corregedor Francisco de Almada e Mendonça to the French engineer Reinaldo Ourdinot. The project started being executed in 1790–1791. The new city hall aimed to substitute the ancient and small town hall in the Old Square, insufficient for the diverse municipal departments and other functions that the ancient town hall had, the new project also took into account the considerable increase in population.

The new city hall, with its political functions beginning in 1807, was built to serve as the headquarters of the municipal powers and as a retirement home for the shire's corregedores (representatives of the royal jurisdiction).

== Architecture ==
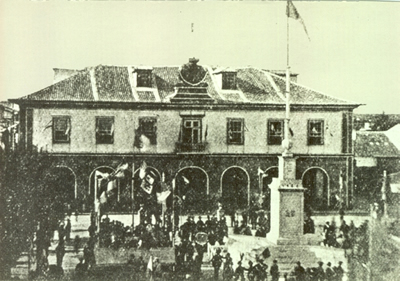
City Hall in mid-19th century

The town hall was built between 1790 and 1791 to a design by French engineer Reinald Oudinot. The building follows the neoclassical principles of late 18th-century urbanism.

The façade is solid and slightly archaic, reminding the English feitoria in Porto, which is visible in the arch stonework in the ground floor. The upper floor has rectangular windows over the ground floors' arches axes. The straight platband that completes the façade is cut, at the middle, by an imposing royal coat-of-arms. In an 1868 description it was said about the building: "One of the buildings that immediately grabs the attention of the traveler, once entering the town, it is, without doubt, the town hall. It is located in a beautiful square, named do Almada, in the town centre, and it has majestic appearance".

The building's present-day appearance is due to the actions of Rocha Peixoto and financial support from the Bonitos de Amorim family, a local family who got rich in Brazil, who added azulejos, in 1908–10, a work by the Belgian painter Joseph Bialman. Since 1974, the building is protected by the Portuguese national monuments institute, the IGESPAR, as a "Building of Public Importance".
