= Port of Póvoa de Varzim =

Coordinates: 41°22′26″N 8°45′55″W

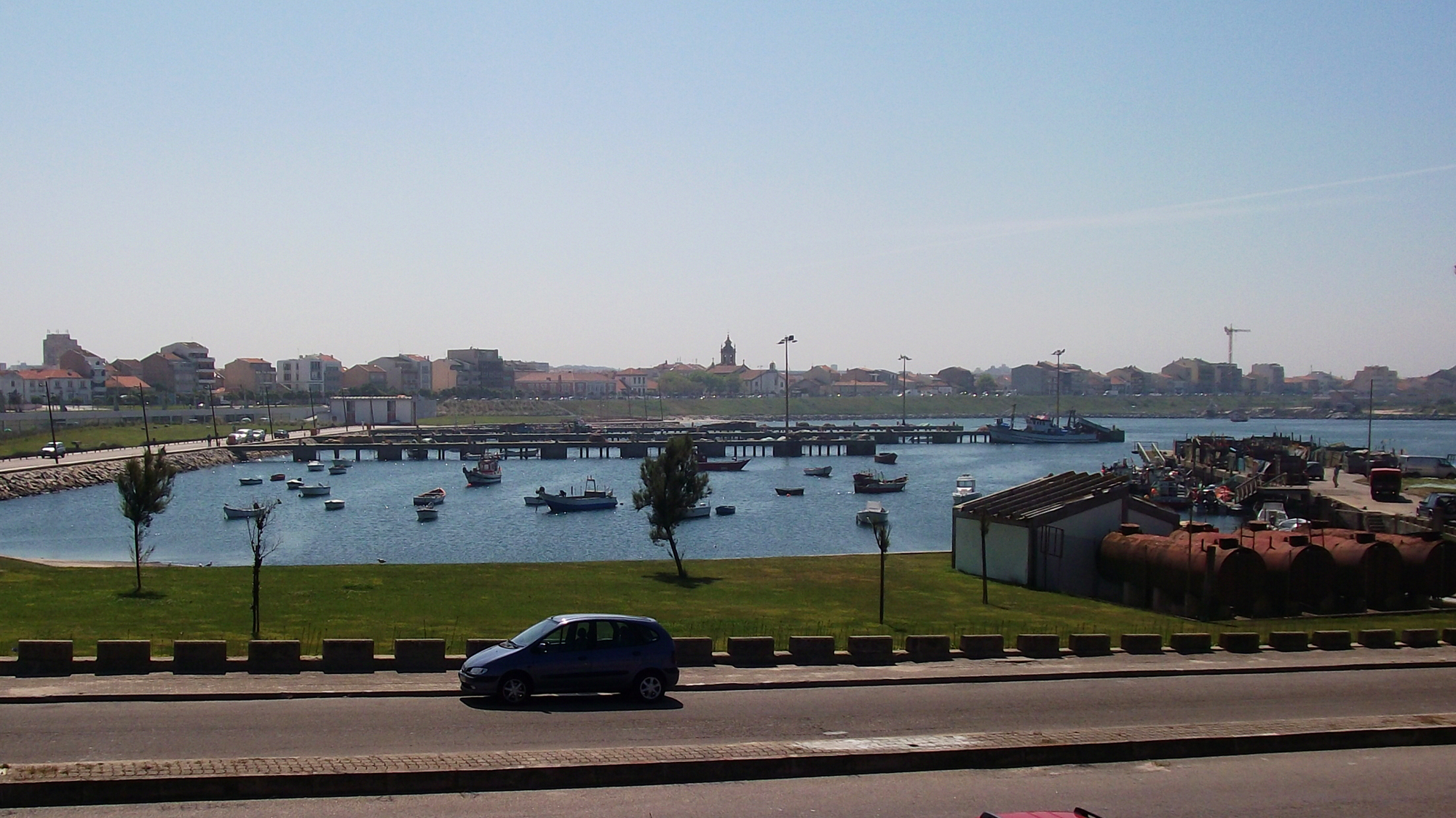
Port of Póvoa de Varzim

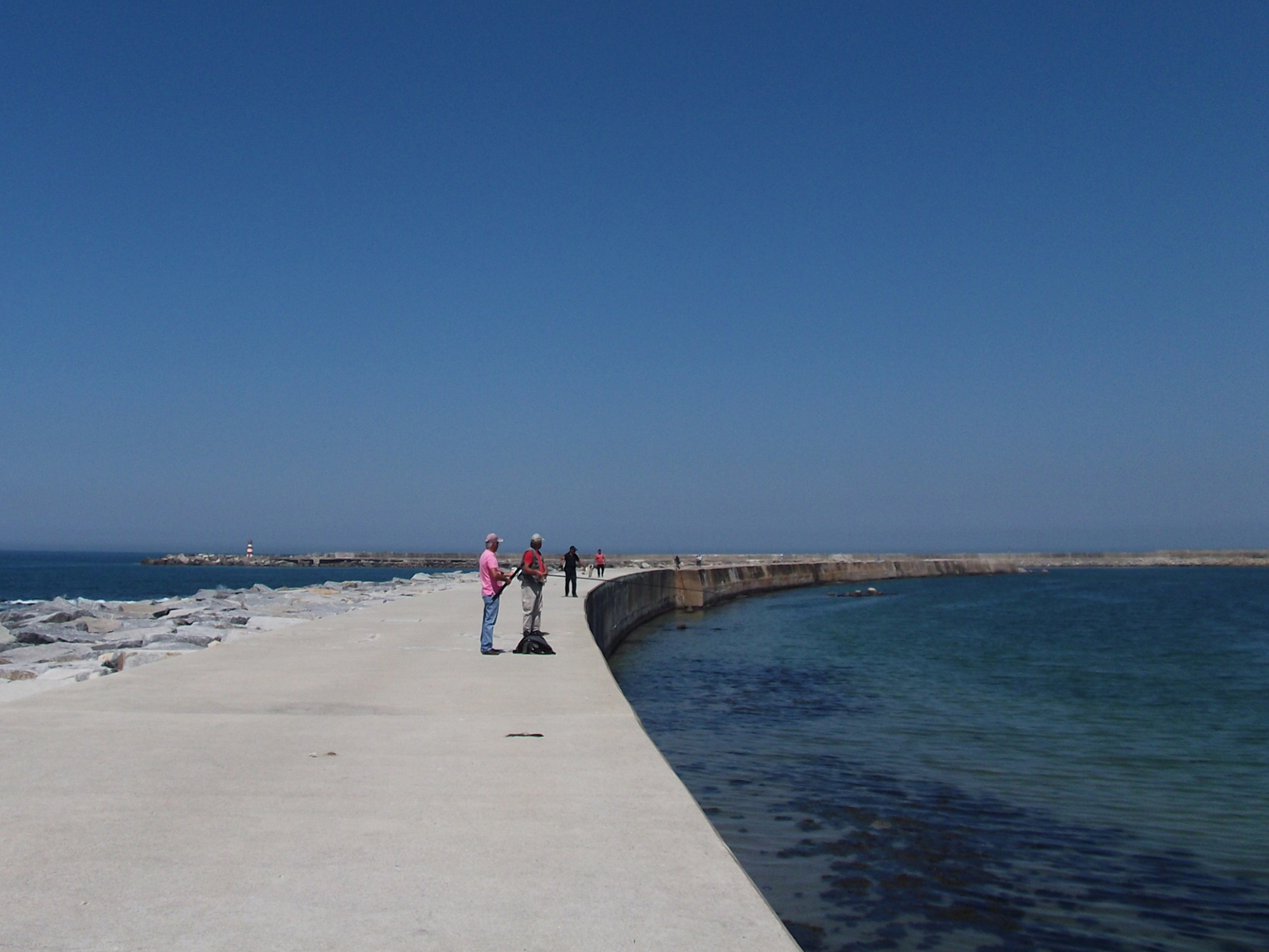
The breakwaters.

The Port of Póvoa de Varzim is a seaport built in Enseada da Póvoa Bay in the city of Póvoa de Varzim in Portugal. During the Middle Ages, it was known as Port of Varzim (Porto de Veracim in Old Portuguese).

Once used for trade and shipbuilding, it is currently used for fishing and recreation, with a marina located within its breakwaters. The port was fundamental to the establishment of Póvoa de Varzim as a municipality in 1308 and the development of the town. During the Middle Ages, its profitability attracted knights, kings and the Church. In this small bay the local fishermen developed the Poveiro boats and Povoan knowledge of the seas and shipbuilding were substantial during the Age of Discovery. After 1000 years of recorded history and continuous use, the port of Póvoa de Varzim became a notable and prosperous fishing port in the 18th century due to its fishermen's seafaring and fishing expertise, considered the best in Portugal.

The north breakwater, the main one, is known as "Paredão" (Portuguese for "Big Wall"). It was first built in 1795 and rebuilt in the following centuries. The most important works on the port were made during the Salazar regime in the early 20th century; the current configuration of the port corresponds to that New State project. The port is protected by the north breakwater, heading south-southwest, which has a lighthouse with a red flashing light and a siren. The south breakwater heads north-northwest; it has a long-flashing green light.

== History ==
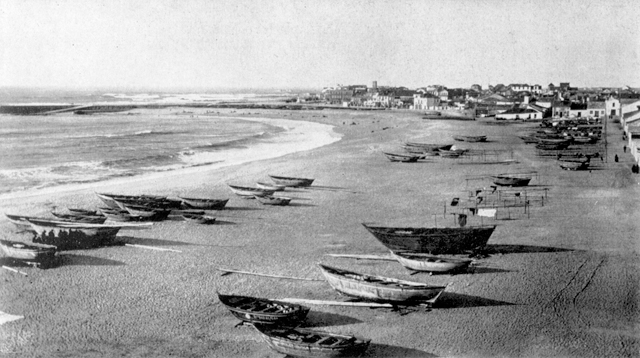
The sheltered bay after the works of Reinaldo Ourdinot.

=== The medieval port ===
Archaeological data around the port of Póvoa de Varzim date to the Roman period. A Roman fish factory could have existed in the area of Junqueira, bordering the port, where a number of artifacts were found. A factory is known, with certainty, in the northern area of the city near the cove of Lagoa Beach.

The historical records of the seaport dates to the 11th century, when the sheltered bay started being regularly used by ships due to its sheltered characteristics.

In the 11th century, Guterre Pelayo became the Lord of Varzim. According to the Livro Velho de Linhagens, the Ancient Book of Ancestries, he acquired the port of Varzim and several other possessions from Henry, Count of Portugal. Guterre was a decisive Reconquista captain during those years.

One of the great-grandsons of Guterre Pelayo, Lourenço Fernandes da Cunha had great fortune in the town of Varzim and surrounding land. His family ruled the area as the Honour of Varzim (honrra de Veracim), a knights honour. Sancho, as king of Portugal, disliked the power Lourenço got, as such the king ordered the destruction of several of his properties and took over most of the land.

In the 1220 inquiries it was said that in the Royal Land of Varzim, a royal butler area, there were 20 families, who gave to the King, when he came into town, 6 dinheiros for the stay; and by royal charter, if they did not go to the sea on Friday, they paid 5 mealhas (small copper coin with little value); and paid from the fisheries, the navão (one fish for each boat).

One of the sons of Dom Lourenço was Gomes Lourenço, very influential knight and godfather of King Denis. Dom Gomes Lourenço, as it is deduced from his personal 1290 Inquiries, took advantage of his relationship with important people in order to get the recognition of the seaport of Varzim, located in Lower Varzim, as his honour. He tried to convince King Denis, that the King's father, Afonso III, took it from him unfairly. In this way, Dom Gomes and his descendants, who are part of the honour of Varzim, went to the seaport and got the navão from the fishermen, justifying the attitude with the honor.

By this, King Denis granted a royal charter to Varzim in 1308, ordering some local inhabitants to build a maritime settlement (Póvoa), he promoted farming development and the use of the seaport for the transport of production such as bread, wine and salt, but also fisheries from which the king took the best profits "the whale, the dolphin or royal belongings", that is, the most profitable catches. One of the terms of the charter ordered the inhabitants who brought bread, wine, salt or sardines, when unloading ferries or vessels in the port of Póvoa de Varzim, granted for each ferry or vessel, 7 soldos. These were the customs rights that belonged to the king and substituted the navão (a fish in each boat).

Pinho Leal, in the book Portugal Antigo e Moderno (1876), stated that Castelo da Póvoa fort, was built in the 15th century, during the reign of John I of Portugal in order to protect the port.

=== Age of Discovery ===
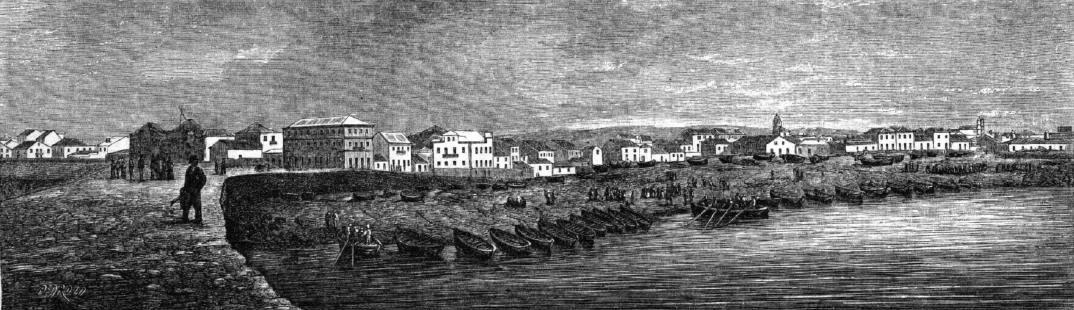
View from the Breakwater in the mid-19th century.

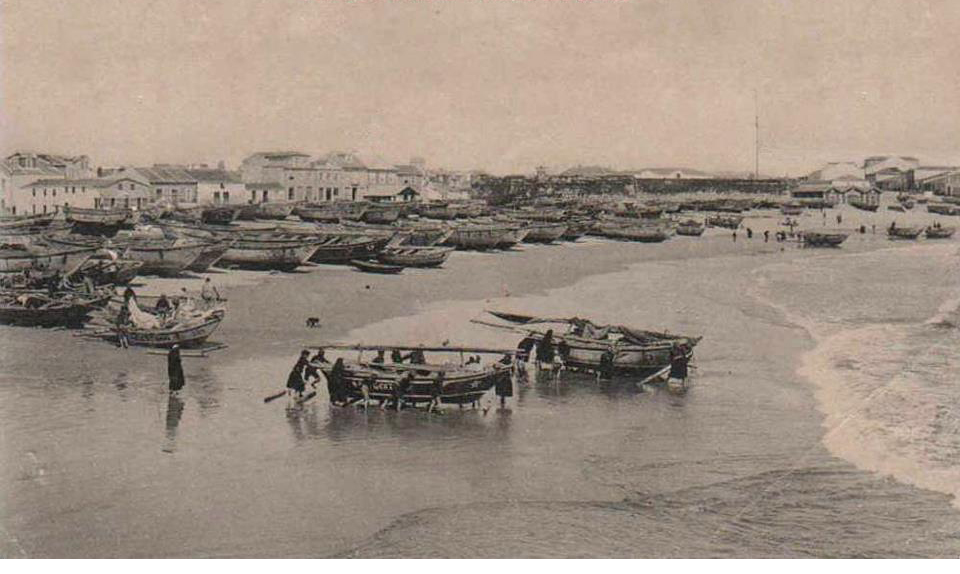
Port of Povoa de Varzim around the fortress in 1916.

In the 16th century, the fishermen started to work in maritime activities, as pilots or seafarers in the crew of the Portuguese ships, due to their high nautical knowledge. The fishermen of the region are known to fish in Newfoundland since at least 1506.

In 1547, a registry of ships docking or leaving the port was made by the main guard Annes Cadilhe, in which an English ship was especially noticeable. In the seaport documents, the construction of a notable ship is documented: the warship N.S. de Guadalupe built in Póvoa sheltered bay, with Povoan Diogo Dias de São Pedro as captain, who gained fame in the squadron that gettered in Lisbon to restore Pernambuco on 15 March 1631, that the Dutch captured in 1630. The carrack was constructed by Povoan merchants and Captain Diogo Dias did not want to accept the government's gratifications, and paid the crew with his own money, who followed him with dedication and courage. Years later, the carrack returned to the port, after trading in Angola. His brother, António Cardina, Póvoa de Varzim's town hall judge, was the main pilot of the Portuguese armada and gained notability in the defense and liberation of the city of Bahia, also captured by the Dutch.

In the 17th century, there was an increase in shipbuilding activities and a significant part of the population worked as Ribeira carpenters (shipbuilders) or related activities.

=== Golden Age of Fishing ===
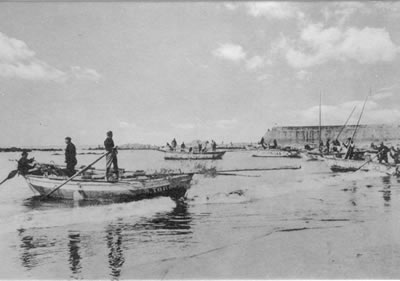
Fishing boats near the breakwater.

In the 17th century, fishing activities started to be of significant economic value with the salted fish business, and in the 18th century, Póvoa became, by far, the largest fish market in Northern Portugal supplying even inland provinces. Carvalho da Costa, in Corografia Portugal, of 1706, stated that the Town of Póvoa de Varzim is an ancient settlement, with sheltered bay harbour, in which in ancient times ships docked and left, Dom Guterre, of the Cunha branch, was its lord....

The Nossa Senhora da Lapa Brotherhood, founded in 1761 by the fishermen, got a charter in which they got authorization to build their homes in "chãos da areia", giving rise to a new and planned fisher quarter around the port of Póvoa de Varzim.

In the Memorias economicas da Academia real das sciencias de Lisboa (Economic memories of the Royal Academy of Sciences of Lisbon) it states that the fishermen of Póvoa de Varzim are the most frequent in all the Minho coast, and were the most experts and with most practice from Cape St. Vincent to Caminha, with a sizable number of fishermen, ships and fishing devices, and the result is a very considerable quantity of caught fish, stating that "The fishermen of Póvoa de Varzim are always at sea, they are not happy with coastal fisheries, and they get fish from seas, that are ten or twelve leagues away from the town." In 1789, there were 1340 fishermen.

One of the caught fish inventory by Povoans noticed that, for instance, for the year of 1866, the product of transactions made in Póvoa, directly by the fishermen and fish traders, summed up 230 000$000 réis and the result of the fish sold from Caminha to Figueira da Foz valued 180 000$000 réis. The taxes paid in the fiscal station was of 5000$000 réis. Yearly Póvoa supplied the city of Porto with 1600 barrels of sardine and over 3000 loads of fish. However, the number of loads to Minho, Trás-os-Montes, and Beira Alta was inestimable. It was said that "the people who know Póvoa are sure that if, in any statistical map, could be truly accounted the importance of exported fish to those provinces, not much people would believe in it, because they would be marveled."

The historical seaport lighthouses, Farol da Lapa and Farol de Regufe, were built in the 19th century. By getting the alignment between the two points of light, the fishermen knew that the boat was in the strait corridor between dangerous underwater rocks and sandbank, where they could cross safely in an area where numerous fishermen lost their lives in the course of several generations. However, the town's light is known since the 16th century.

Paredão breakwater

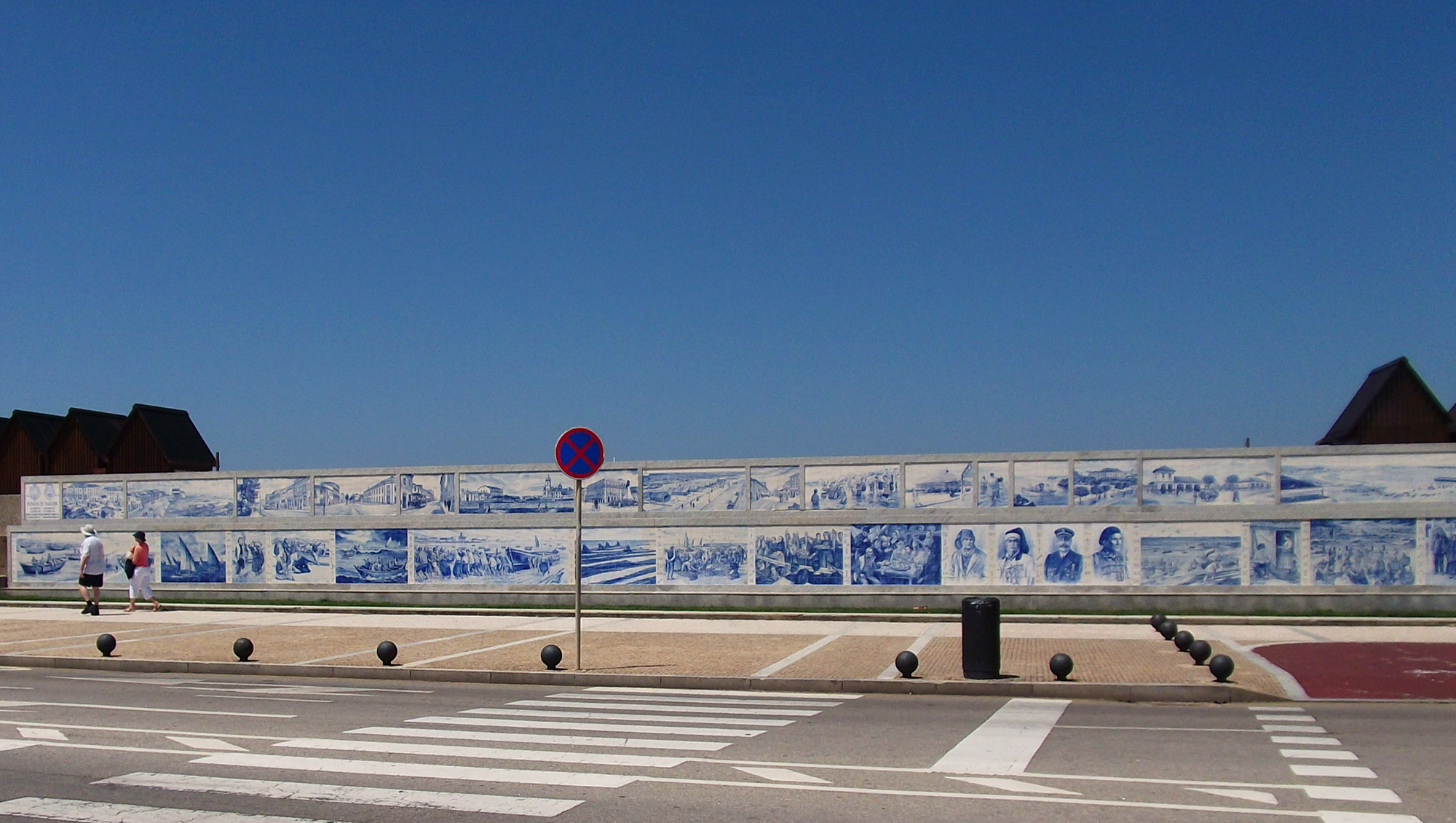
Azulejo painted tilework on Povoan culture and history in the Paredão

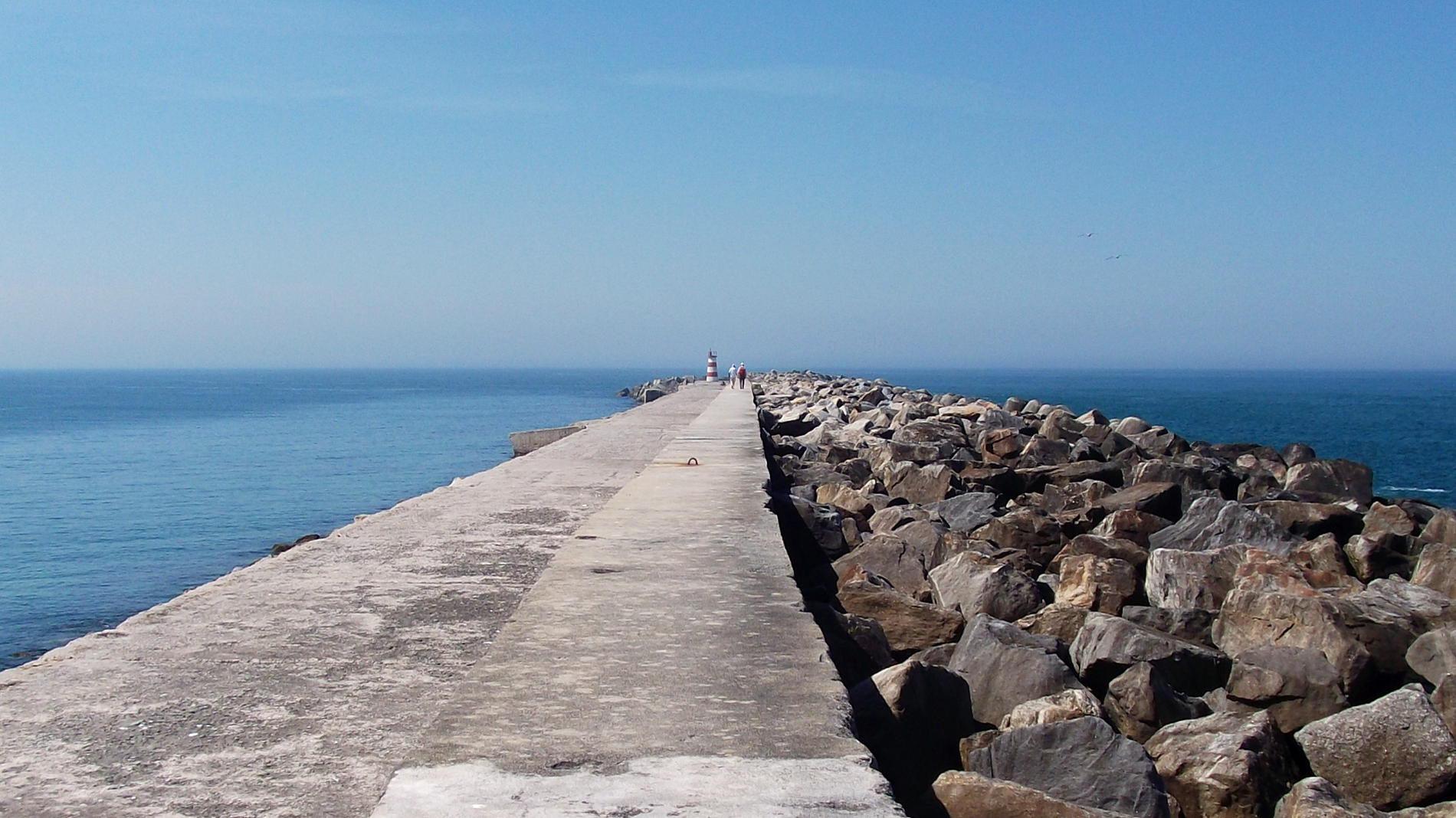
The tip of the main breakwater

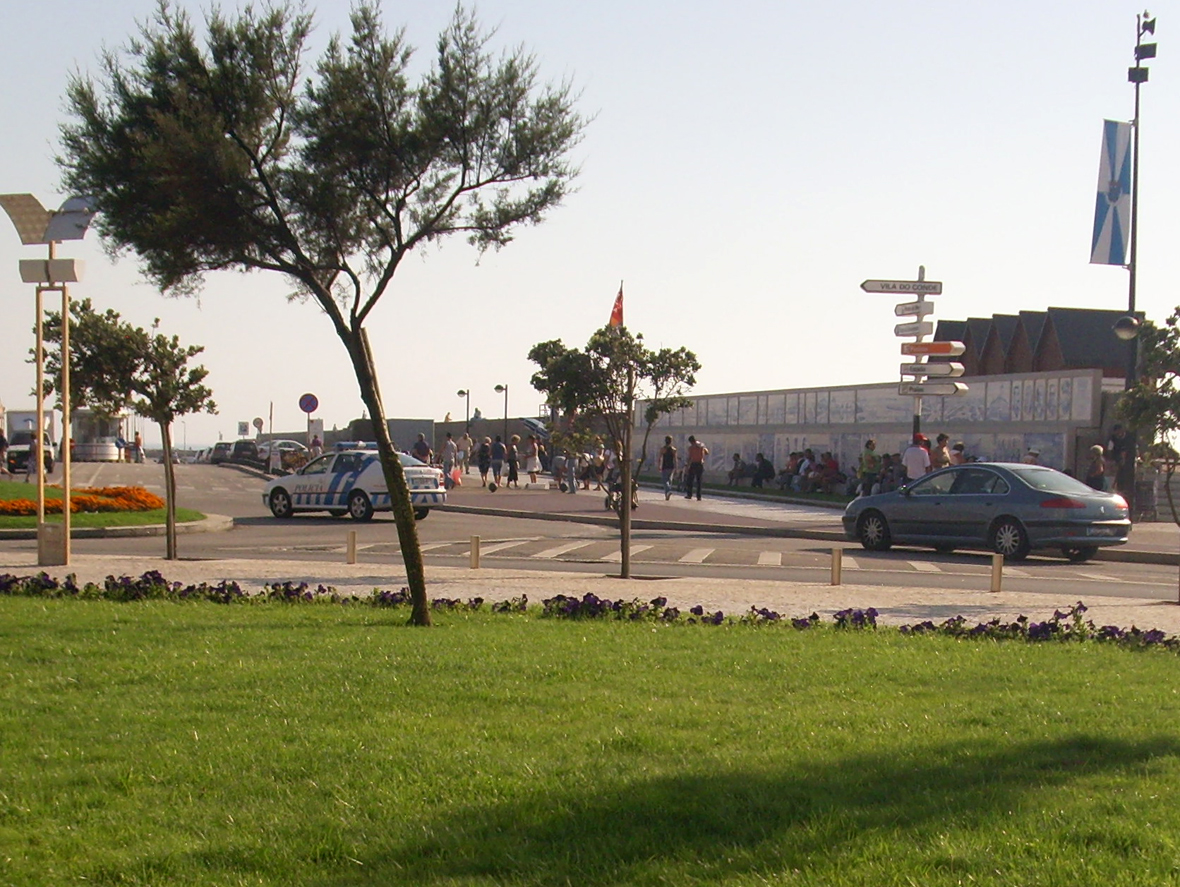
Startpoint of the famous Paredão breakwater

=== Seaport works pleas ===
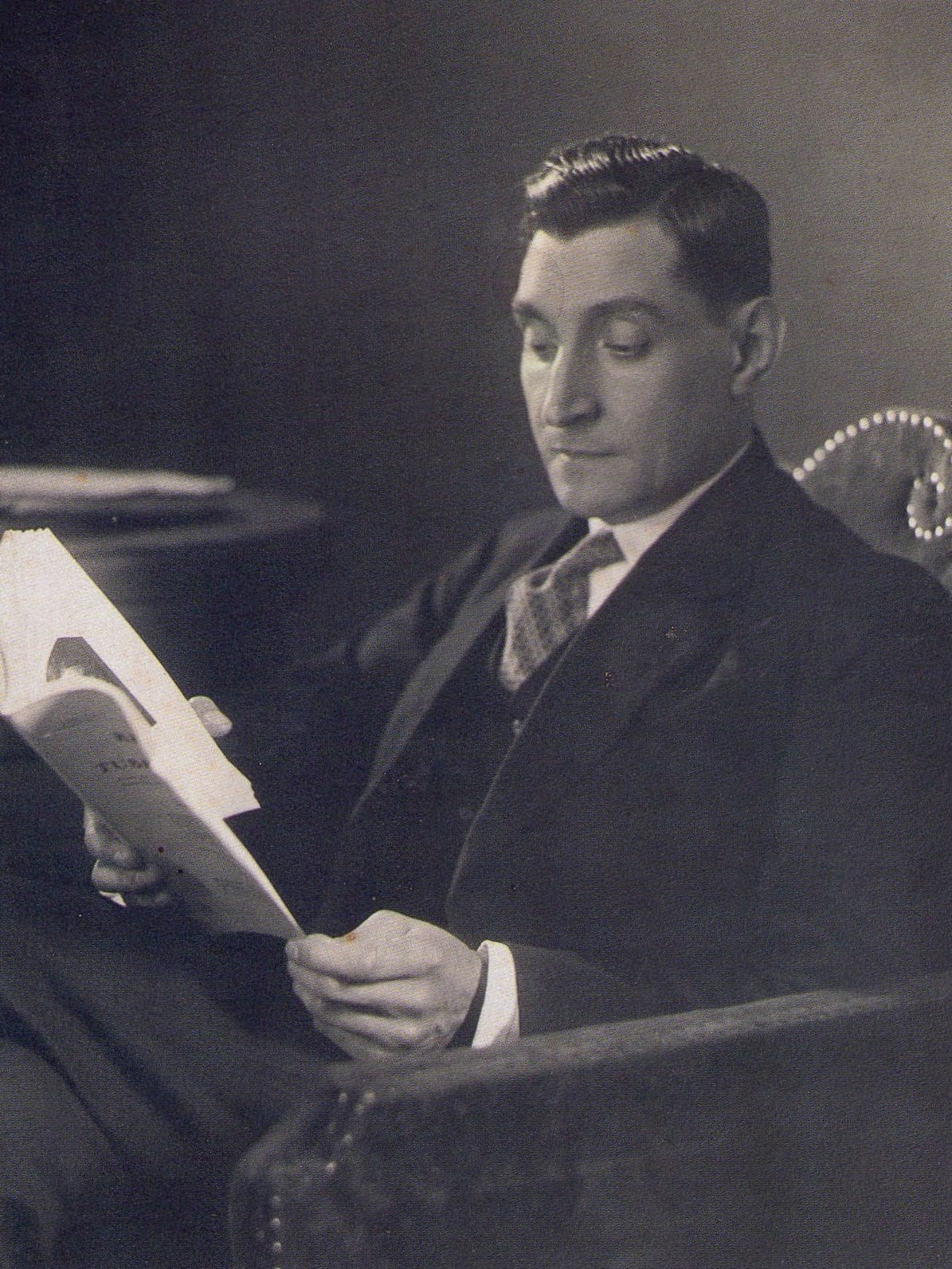
In 1939, Salazar ordered the construction of the new breakwaters which still stand today.

In the 18th century, another document stated: "There is in this town one of the best sheltered bays in this kingdom; the nature formed it, according to the One who created it, and, with artwork that would improve it, by orders of the king and lord, it would be a marvel in Europe.

Queen Maria I authorized the construction works on the seaport in February 1791. French engineer Reinald Oudinot was responsible for the construction under orders of the shire's corregedor Francisco de Almada e Mendonça. In 1792, a dock, known as Caldeira da barra, was built at the estuary of a rivulet. The construction of the northern breakwater started in 1795.

The construction works were incomplete as a south breakwater was needed, near the sandbank, in order to reduce the ocean currents strength. The northern breakwater that was built during this period became known as Paredão de D. Maria I (The Great Wall of Queen Maria I), in later periods as Paredão de D. Luis I, after small construction works during the reign of Louis I of Portugal in the 19th century.

In the beginning of the 19th century, renovation works on the breakwater were needed as it was in ruins. Works started, but slowly due to financial constraints. On 11 March 1825 the necessity of works in the port was addressed by the town hall. And with Corregedor José Joaquim Rodrigues de Bastos orders, works resumed in August. The breakwater reconstruction ended in 1826.

In 1857, the town hall asked the king for a sheltered harbour, stating: "It would be in Portugal a port so good, better than Vigo's. Nevertheless, the liberal regime paid no attention to the Povoan pleas.

Due to the aggregation of Póvoa's harbour, in the beginning of the 20th century and the construction of an artificial port, the Port of Leixões, a significant part of the fisher population moved to the area surrounding it. Emigration to several areas, especially Brazil, Angola and other areas in Portugal, was considerable during this period.

Caetano Vasques Calafate (1890 - 1963) managed the propaganda and funding needed for the construction of the Casa dos Pescadores da Póvoa de Varzim (The Fishermen House), siding Lapa Light, in 1926. This was the first fishermen house in Portugal. On 11 March 1937 the Corporatist Estado Novo regime established the laws for the creation of fishermen houses in all fisher areas throughout the country.

After 200 years of pleas by Povoans, it was under Salazar's Estado Novo regime that the seaport works resumed. Works started in 1939 and ended in the 1950s, with stone extracted from a quarry which later became a small lake named Lagoa da Pedreira (Quarry Lake). One of the partisans of the cause was journalist Caetano Vasques Calafate who wrote about the ambition of the local fishermen in the press of Lisbon and Porto. But the later recognized the deeds of the president of Casa dos Poveiros in Rio de Janeiro, Apílio Oliveira, who wrote to Salazar under the intermediation of the Portuguese embassy in Rio.

=== Recent developments and the sandbank issue ===
At the end of the 1990s, the city hall had gaming taxes collected in Casino da Póvoa and available to be used, something that was not possible before. The city used the funds for further works on the seaport, improving it with piers, leisure venues and the construction of a marina in 1999 near the south breakwater, the location of the shipyard in the 20th century. Nevertheless, the sandbank, a traditional spot where several fishermen died, including the great shipwreck of 1892, continued to be a significant safety problem, and several fishermen moved to other ports, namely Galician ones.

The port's south breakwater also showed aging signs and was recovered in 2009. The Associação Pró-Maior Segurança dos Homens do Mar, with its headquarters in the port, was formed by the fishermen in order to pressure further developments on the seaport and safety at sea, including the complete recovery of it and a permanent solution to the sandbank, something that can be achieved by the enlargement of the north breakwater.

Port of Póvoa de Varzim

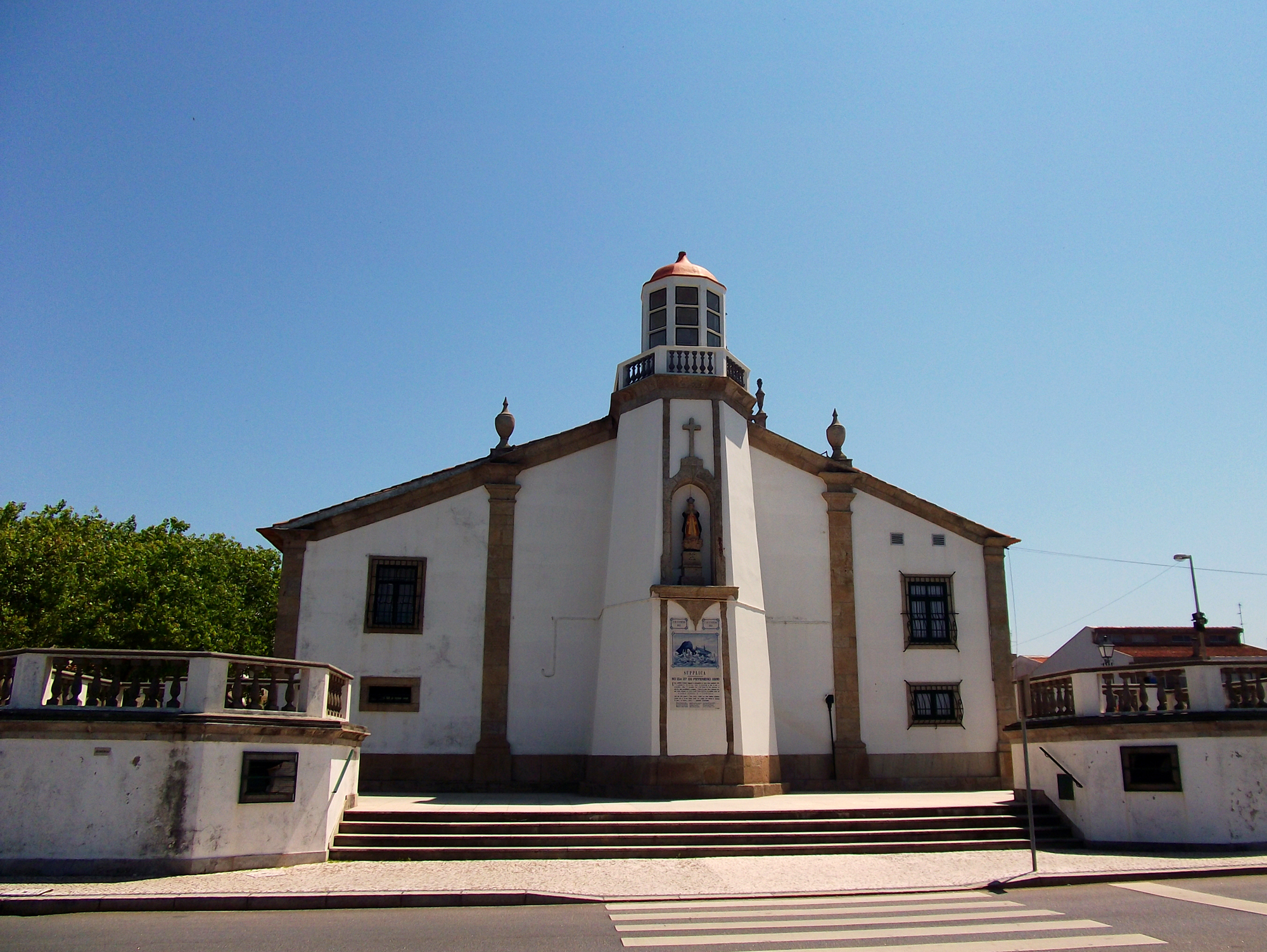
Former Lapa Light in Lapa Church

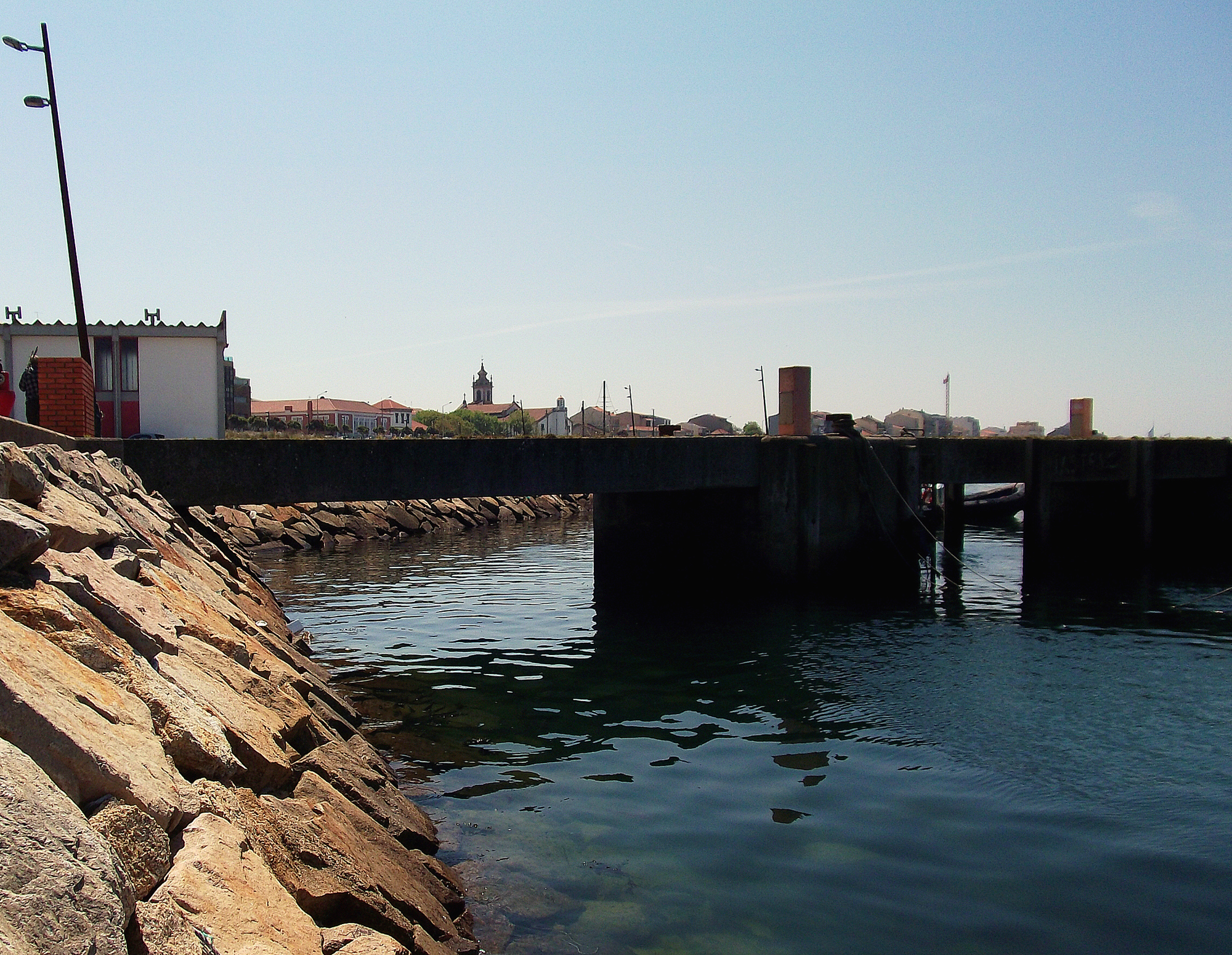
View from the port to Bairro Sul, a fishermen quarter established in the 18th century.

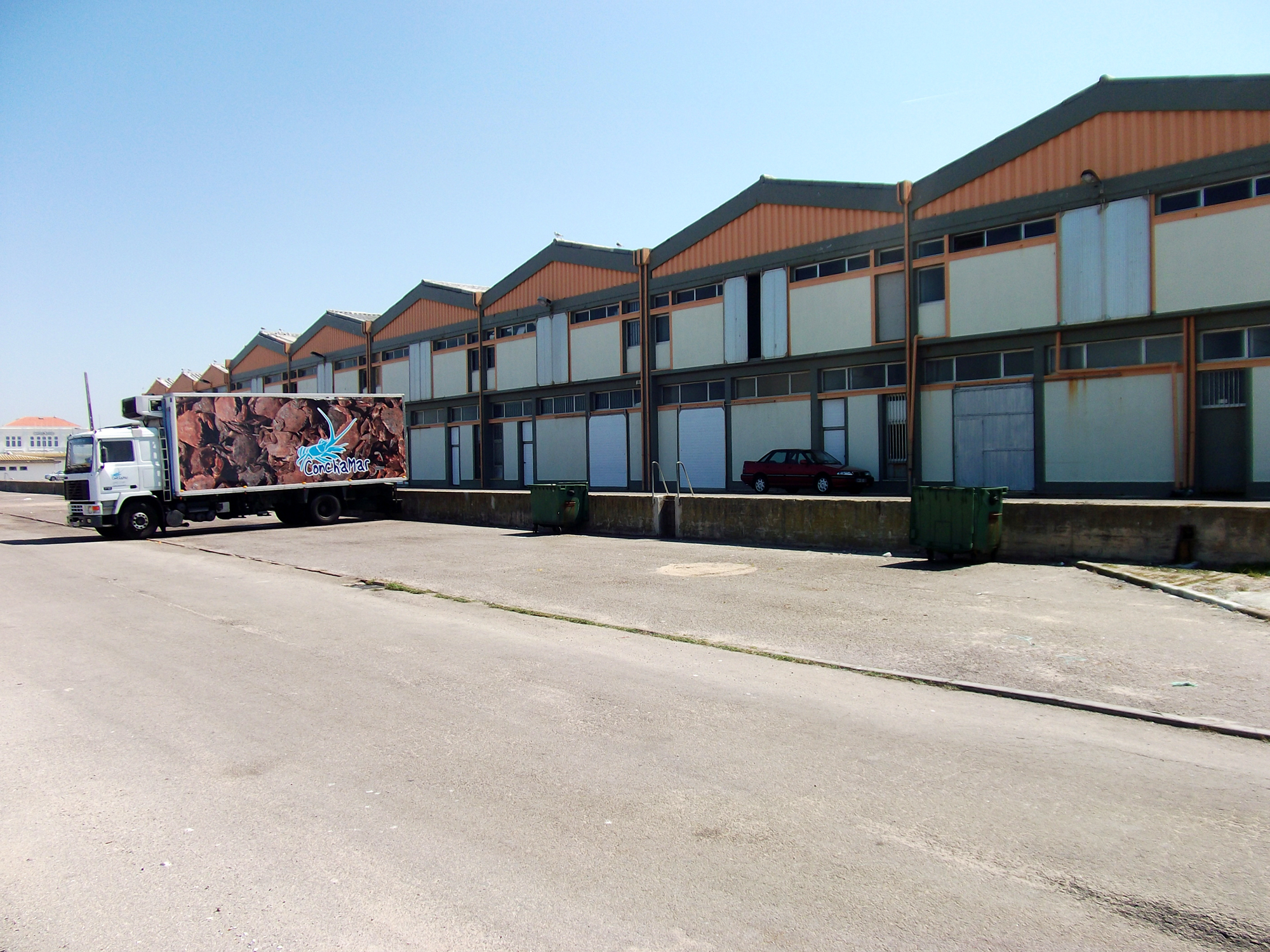
The "Lota" or the fish market

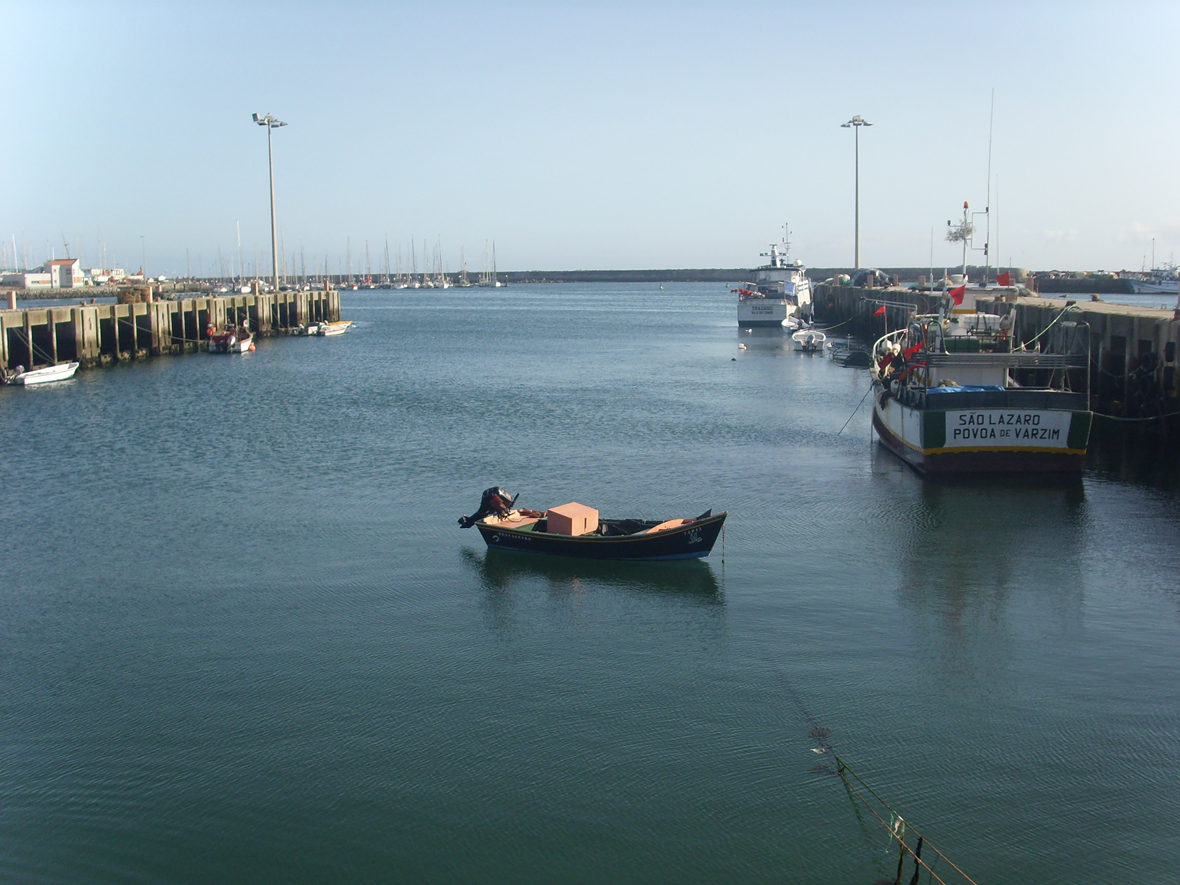
Fishing vessels in the port

== Fish market ==
The fish market is managed by Docapesca Portos e Lotas S.A. which holds 20 fish markets. The fish market is, along with the Viana do Castelo Fish Market, part of the Northern Delegation of the company which is located in the Port of Póvoa de Varzim, it also includes seven small selling posts in smaller traditional fishing communities. Póvoa de Varzim Fish Market, in Póvoa de Varzim Captaincy, has two dependent selling posts (Vila do Conde and Vila Chã, both in Vila do Conde Captaincy). The access to the fish market is available to traders registered in Docapesca and have an infrared remote control or online access license, although only presentational trading is available.

According to the 2010 statistics by DocaPesca, the five most sold species were Sardina pilchardus, Octopus vulgaris, Merluccius merluccius, Trisopterus luscus, and Trachurus trachurus, weighing 1,625,469 kg and valuing €2,714,966, with €1.67 as average price, ranging as low as €0.46 for sardines and the octopus was traded at an average of €2,62. In 2011, sales of these species increased and the most traded species were Octopus vulgaris, Sardina pilchardus, Merluccius merluccius, Trachurus trachurus, and Trisopterus luscus weighing 1,732,105 kg and valuing €3,086,235, with €1.78 as average price ranging from €0.54 for sardines and €2.56 for octopuses.

== Marina ==
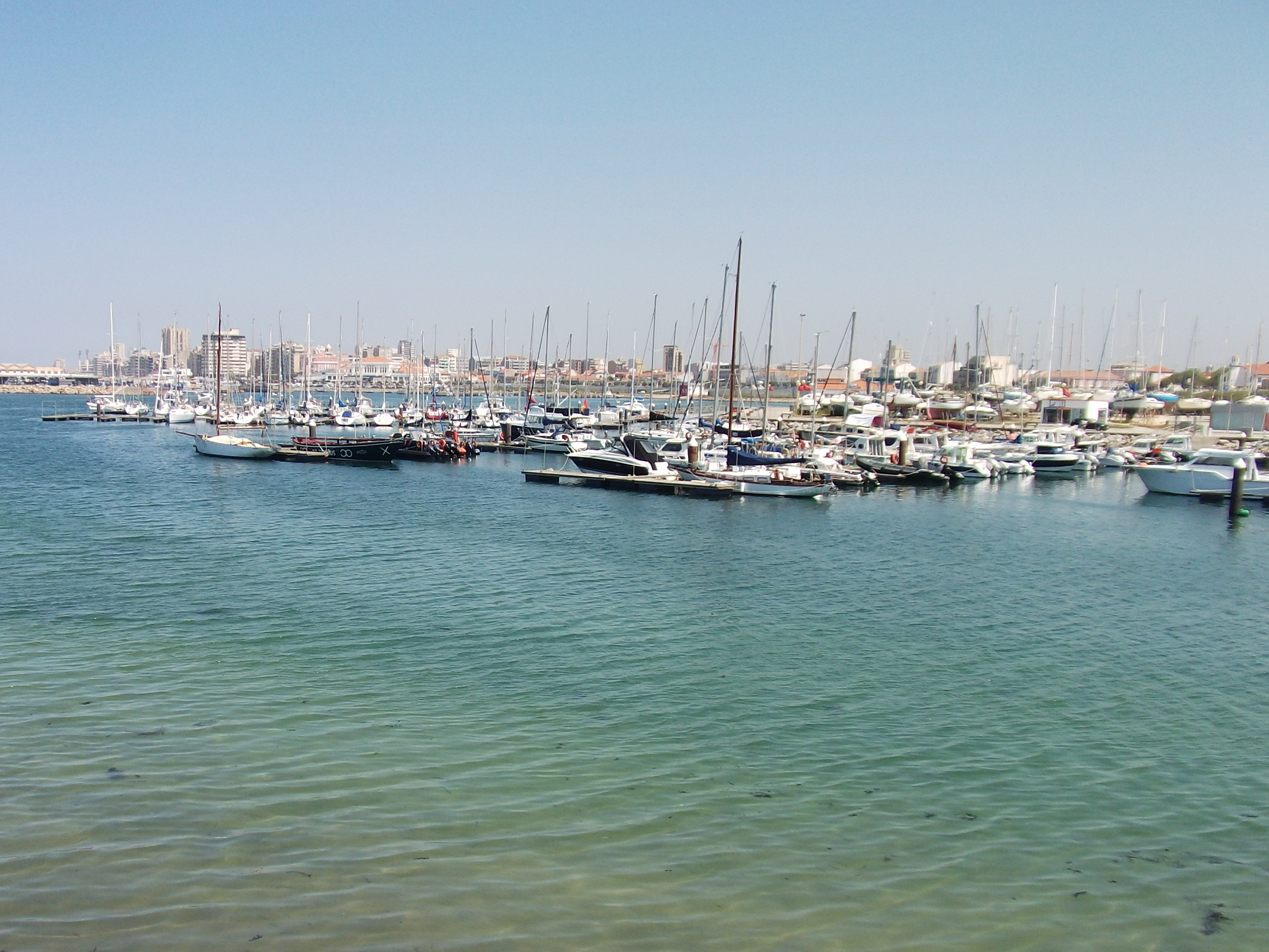
Póvoa de Varzim Marina near the South Breakwater.

Póvoa Marina is a public marina using floating pontoons built by the City Hall of Póvoa de Varzim in June 1999 according to a project by Clube Naval Povoense, the local yacht club, and the management of the area was delivered by the city hall to the club. The marina is financially self-sustainable and is a nautical activities support marina, that should not be confused with real estate equipments called "marina" found in Southern Portugal, and the access to the docks are restricted.

It has a growing popularity, especially noticeable in Northern Portugal and has a planned expansion to the area near Casino da Póvoa. Currently, it has a maximum capacity of 600 boats, including land parking and has over 241 berths, travel-lift (35 ton) and a crane (6.3 ton), tidal grade, 24-hour surveillance, bar, restaurant and other services. It is characterized by its social lifestyle and plurality, it is visited by mariners from all over the world, that number the thousands in a single year and stay there for several months or years. Passing seaman anchoring in the marina, according to main nationality in a recent year, were from the United Kingdom (35%), France (15%), Portugal (10%), Netherlands (8%), Spain (8%), Germany (8%), and Sweden (4%).

== Lota park ==
Lota (in Portuguese it literally means "fish market" and used as such until the 1990s) is a land area within the port of Póvoa de Varzim, near the North Breakwater. In the past, it was a beach where the fish was landed and sold, named Praia de Peixe (Fish Beach), possibly because of the excessively fine sand or its use it was not popular with beach-goers, unlike nearby Praia de Banhos (Baths Beach) with larger sand grains and used by tourists since the 18th century. It was also the location of Ribeira shipyard.

After rehabilitation in the late 1990s, it became a leisure area including a recreation square in front of Casino da Póvoa, with the Lota Auditorium, playgrounds, walkway, trendy establishments and, until recently, Lota Sk8 Parque to accommodate the significant skater community. In Lota, along the piers, there's also green areas for resting.

Lota

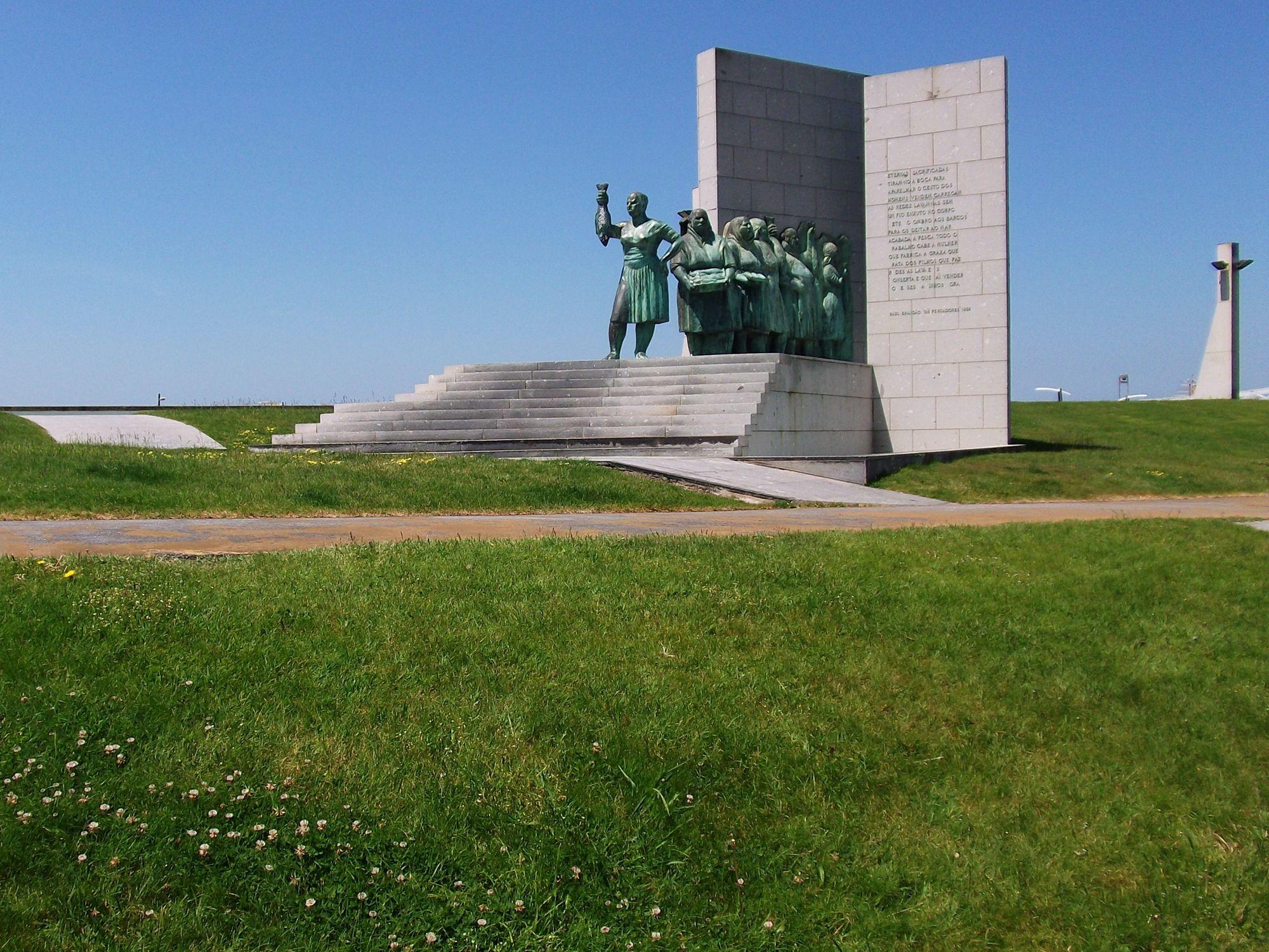
Monument dedicated to the fisherwomen built in 1997

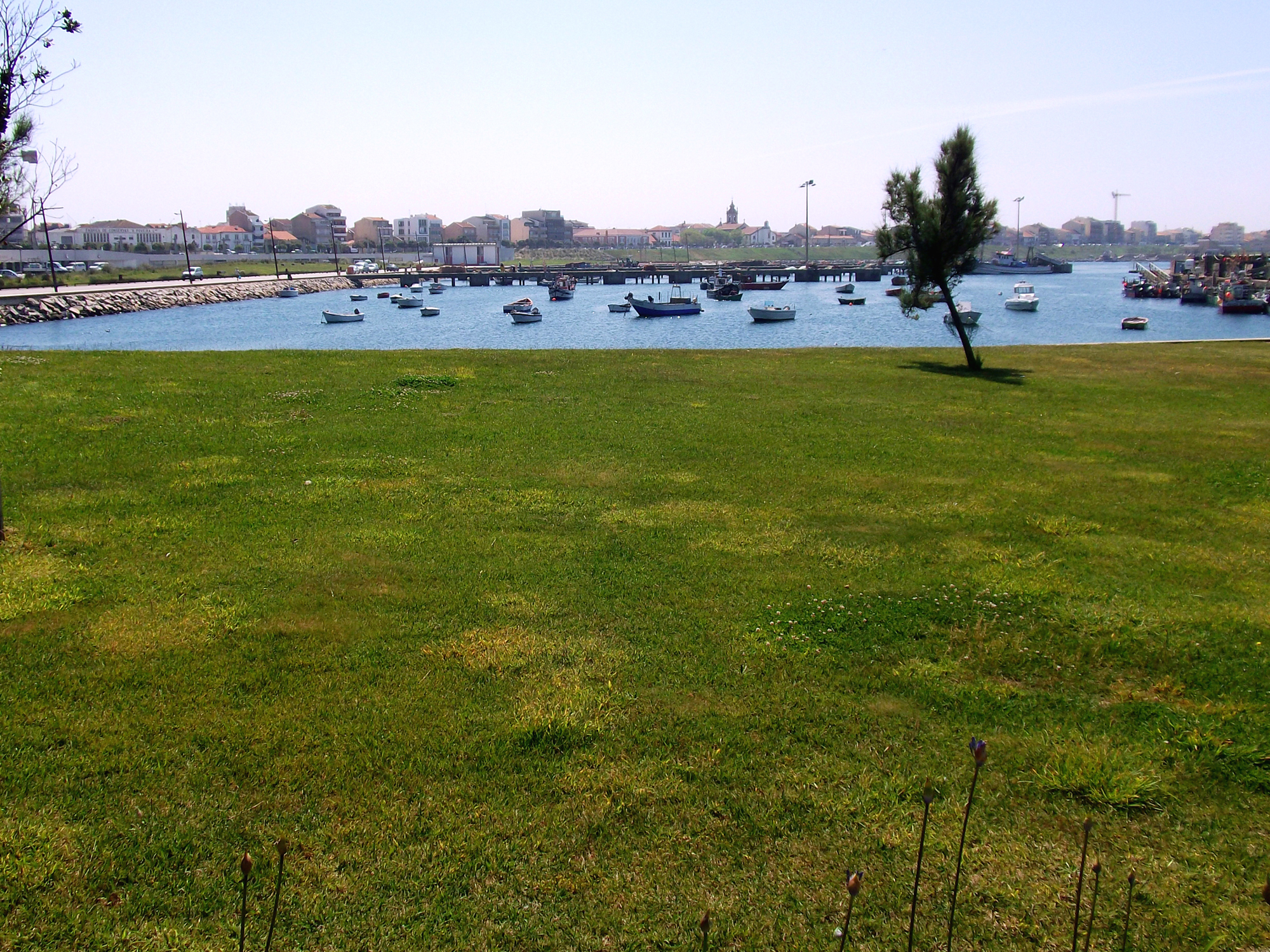
The park.

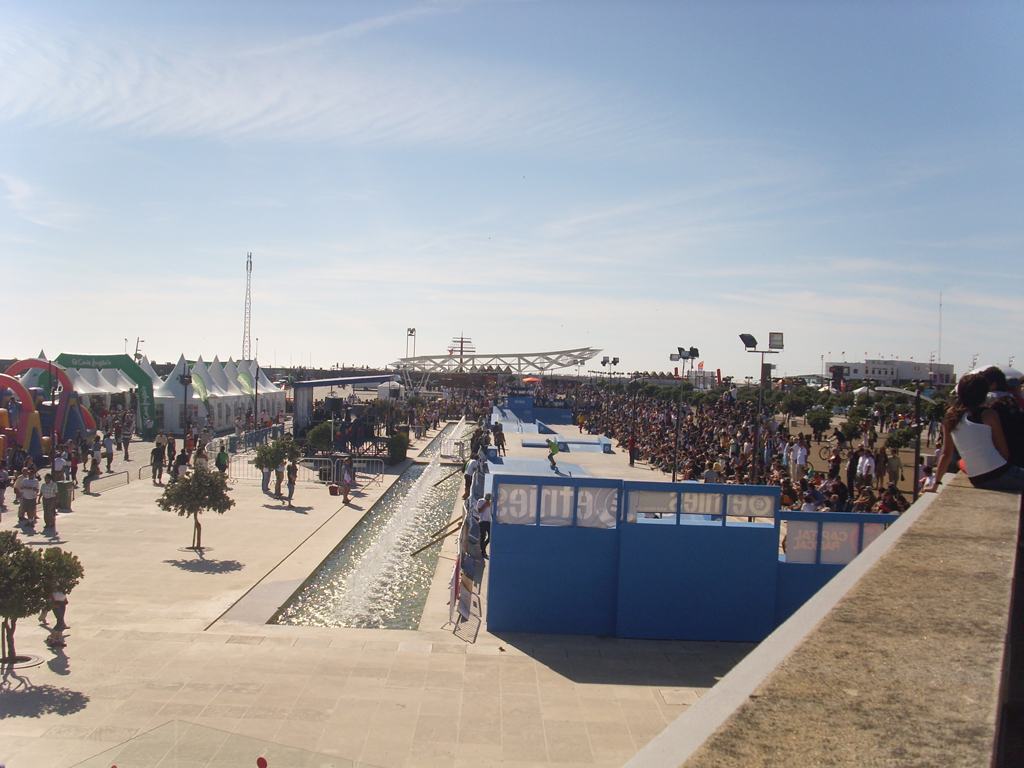
Capital Radical skate show in 2008 around Lota Auditorium

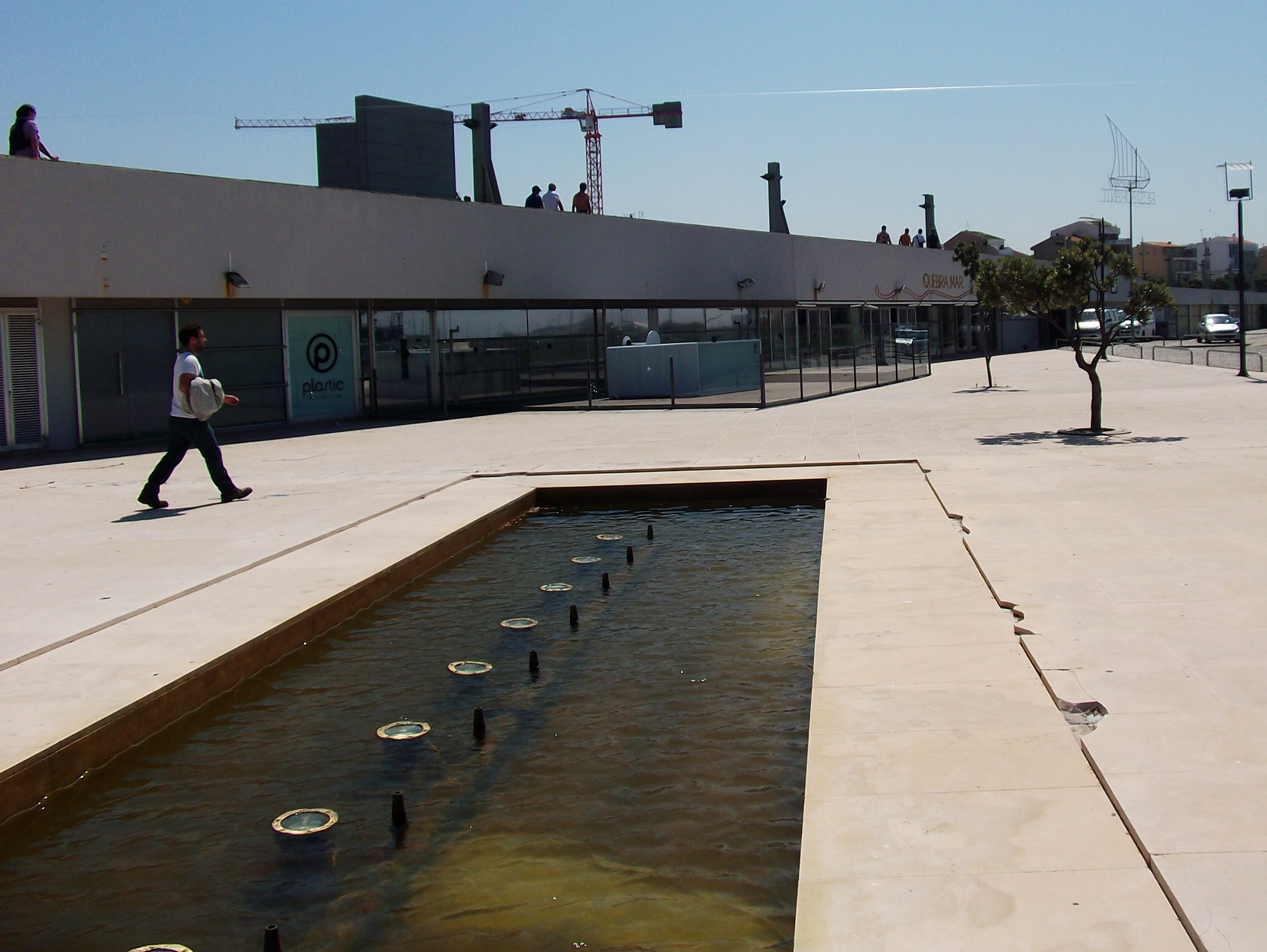
Fishermen warehouses sharing the space with trendy establishments

== Administration, policing and rescue station ==
Currently, the port of Póvoa de Varzim is considered a harbour for leisure activities, according to "Regulamento da Náutica de Recreio" (recreational boating regulation) and approved by the decree nr. 124 of 2004. The harbour master's office (Capitania da Póvoa de Varzim, Captaincy of Póvoa de Varzim), of the Portuguese Maritime Authority, is located in the casino da Póvoa square at Largo Dr. Vasques Calafate n. 1, which is also the location of the local command of the maritime police.

The Póvoa de Varzim captaincy jurisdictional area includes the territorial waters, following the United Nations Convention on the Law of the Sea, the exclusive economic zone and the continental shelf, between the south breakwater of the port of Póvoa de Varzim to the estuary of Rio Alto.

The Instituto de Socorros a Náufragos da Póvoa de Varzim (ISN Póvoa de Varzim) is the rescue station of Póvoa de Varzim, and is located in the port. The ISN was established as a private charity entity on 21 April 1892 by Queen Amélie under the name Real Instituto de Socorros a Náufragos (The Royal Institute of Rescue to Shipwreck victims). Earlier in the year, on 27 February, a tragedy devastated the community. Seven lanchas poveiras wrecked in a storm and 105 fishermen were killed, just meters off the shore.
