= A Filantrópica =

Arts cooperative in Póvoa de Varzim, Portugal

Coordinates: 41.3777°N 8.7618°W

A Filantrópica is an arts cooperative located in Póvoa de Varzim, Portugal. Its headquarters and arts and literature galleries are located in Rua da Lapa street, 1. Currently, the main entrance is located in Rua 31 de Janeiro, a parallel and more important street.

== History ==
After Casa dos Pescadores Poveiros was built in 1926 to support the old fishermen, something similar was thought for the Povoan workmen. On November 1, 1928, a group of Povoan workmen gathered to celebrate a friend of the poor, Joaquim Graça, who promoted the cause. A commission (Comissão Pró Causa dos Poveiros) was created and Manoel Felipe de Castro became its president under the direction of José da Costa Novo. The organizing commission started to work on April 6, 1929, with several notable people.

The Póvoa de Varzim Trade Union of Construction (Sindicato Único da Construção Civil da Póvoa de Varzim) that, after electing a commission, sent a memo to Povoans living abroad in order to gather financial aid. The Povoan settlement in Manaus, in the Brazilian Amazon, notable for its ardent support for its native town, organized itself in Grupo Pró Póvoa (Support Póvoa Group), and nominated Baptista de Lima as their spokesman in Póvoa. The commission of Manaus stated they would gather financial aid with the condition that the house would not be exclusive for the construction trade union.

An organizing commission was set on February 20, 1929, under the presidency of Joaquim dos Santos Graça, following the indication of the Manaus Commission. A new commission was set in the same year by João Baptista de Lima, spokesman of the Manaus Commission and António Correia dos Santos, from the local press.

In 1933, several classes of workmen associated to the cause and representatives of each profession were elected: press, metallurgy, rope-makers, hotel employees, electricians, shoemakers, tailors and others. In 1933, the propaganda for the construction of the Casa do Operário Poveiro (Povoan Workemen House) to shelter retiree, disabled or poor Povoan workmen. An elegant and old building named Montepio was bought on July 25, 1933, and the house was inaugurated on December 3, 1933, by the mayor, Carlos Moreira and the municipal secretary of treasury, Captain Carlos Canelhos. The building was the old headquarters of Montepio association that existed between March 1, 1864, and 1877 whose services supported, especially, the fisher class, but also artists and farmers.

A ruling from the Secretary of Corporations and Social Providence ordered the shutdown of the House of Workmen, given that the Estado Novo regime understood that the organization was of professional character and not of social providence. On July 16, 1935, the house was founded again as "A Filantrópica Sociedade Cooperativa CRL", paying tribute to Povoans of Brazil by not allowing its shutdown, as many of them contributed to build in Póvoa something noble.

== Activities ==
A Filantrópica activities include:

- Baptista de Lima School of Arts and Professions: Painting, drawing, artistic ceramics, Russian, Portuguese and French language courses;
- Music School: viola, piano, organ, cavaquinho, guitar, accordion, teaching of music, Synthesizer, chorus;
- Conferences and debates;
- Exhibits.
