= Póvoa de Varzim beaches =

Group of golden sandy beaches in northern Portugal

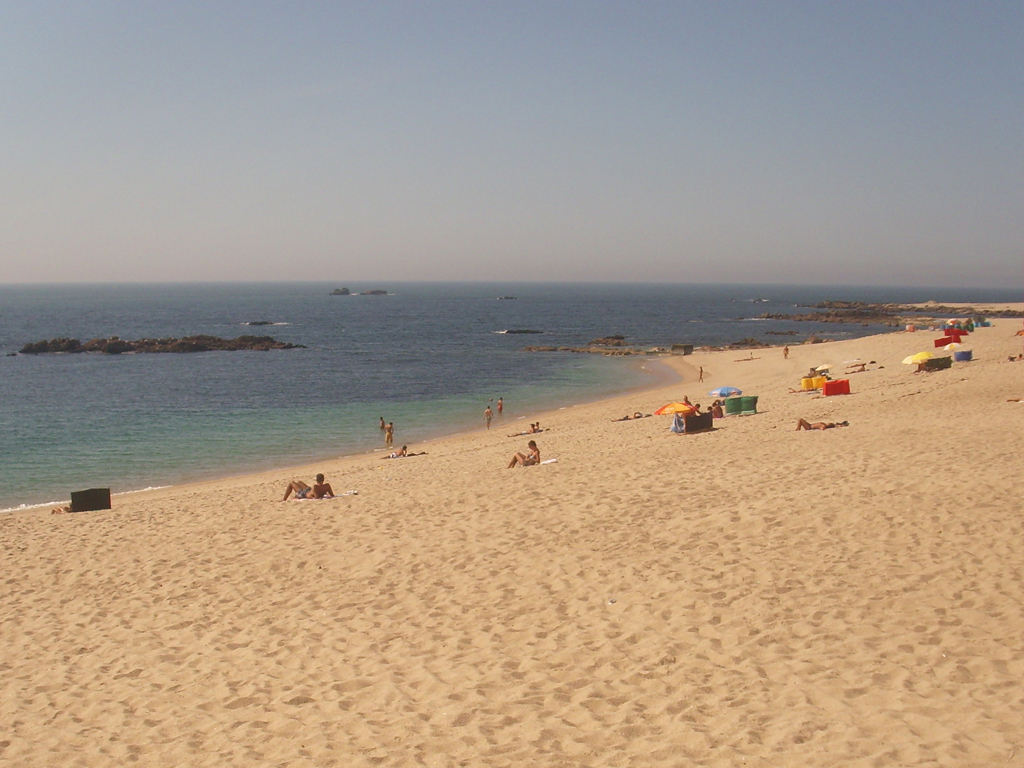
Lagoa Beach.

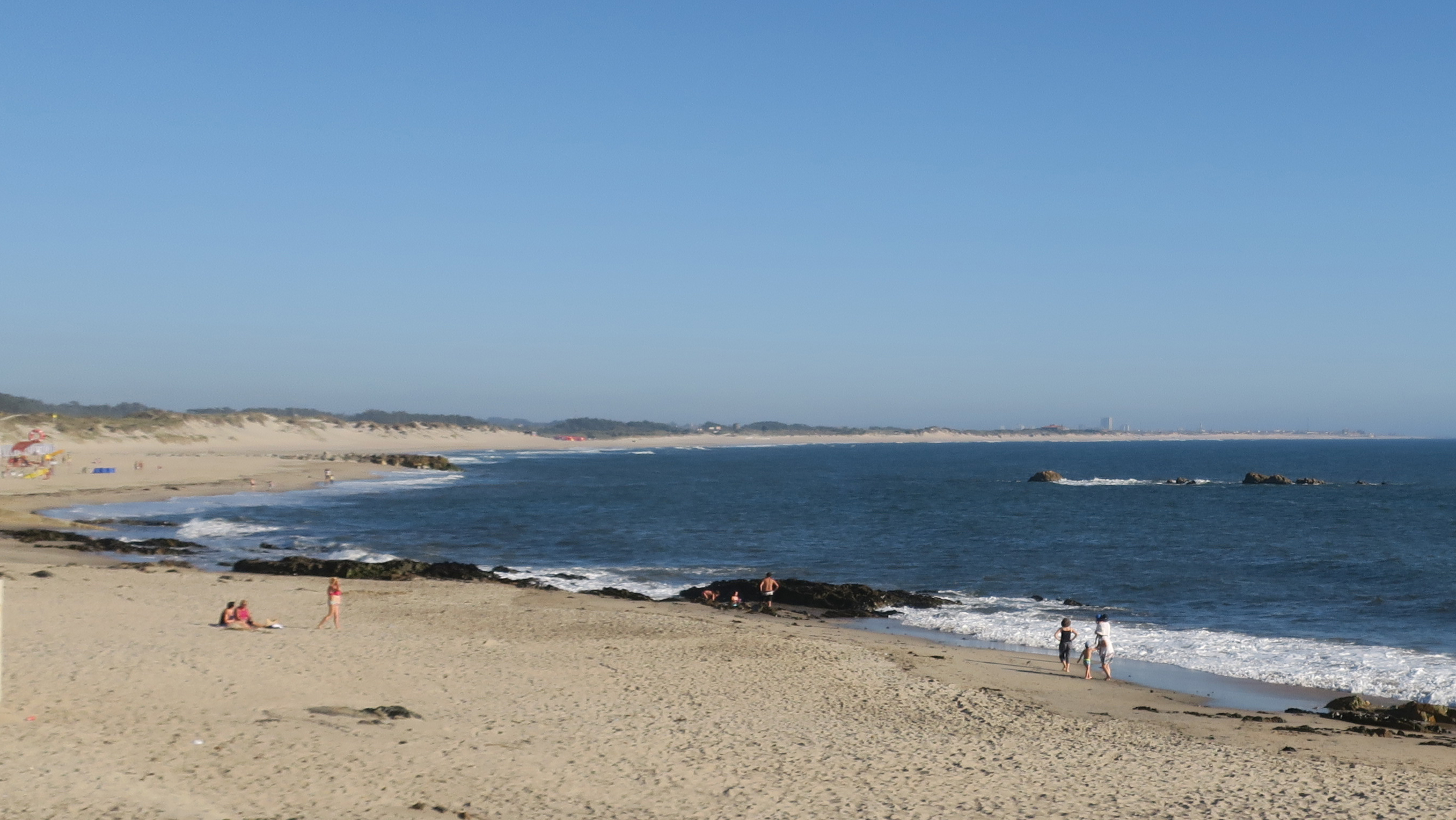
Northwestern coast of Póvoa de Varzim as seen from Apúlia, Esposende (11 kilometers; 6.8 miles away).

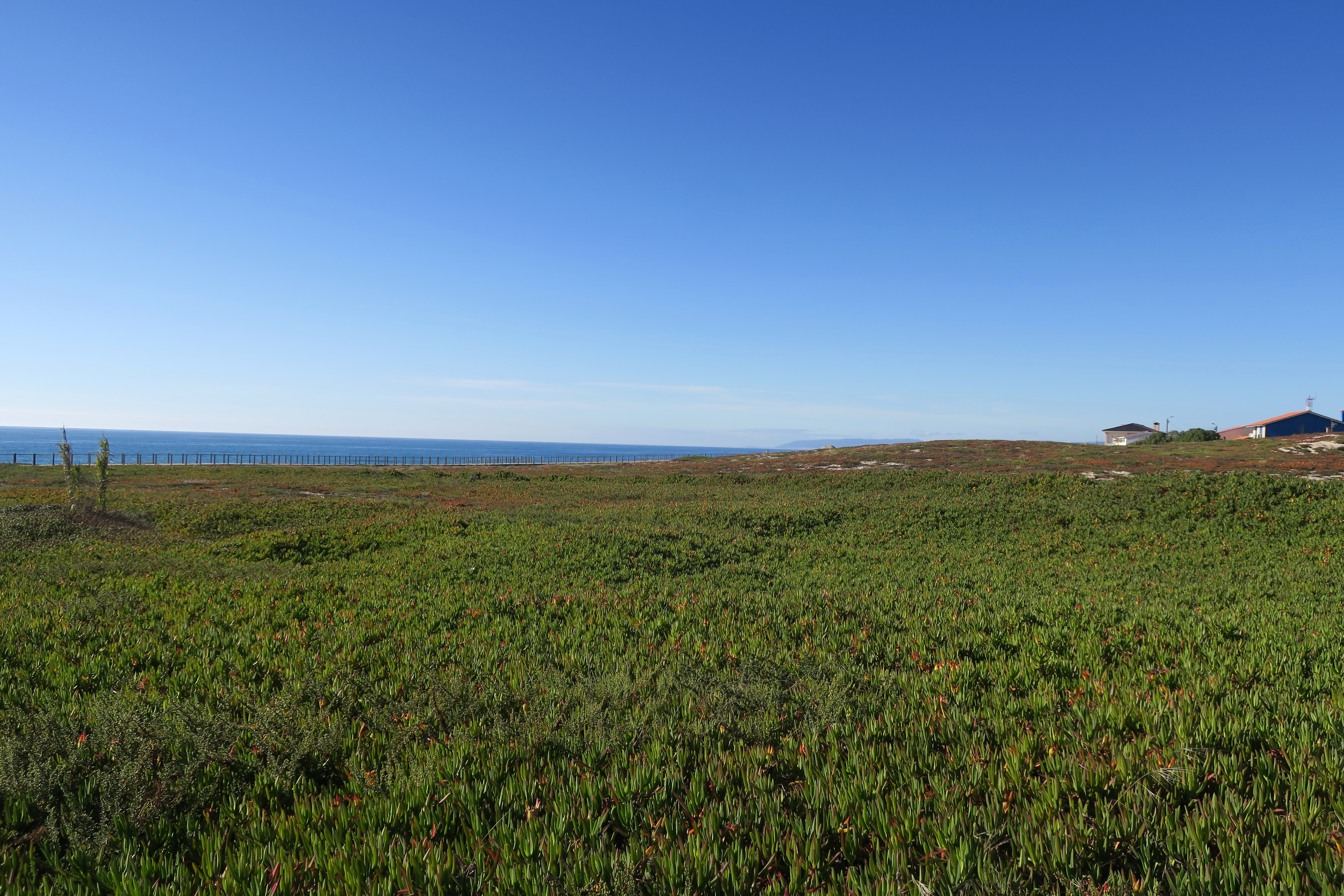
Boardwalk in Santo André Beach.

The beaches in Póvoa de Varzim are an extensive and continuous group of golden sandy beaches forming small bays or coves along the shoreline in northern Portugal. These do not have any barrier and are in fact a single beach, over 12 km long, under the name Praia da Póvoa de Varzim (Póvoa de Varzim Beach). Division may be arbitrary and serve localization porpoises.

Historically, the waterfront has been used for trading, fish industry, health and leisure since remote periods. The fish industry in Póvoa de Varzim developed during the Roman Empire and is one of the earliest tourist areas in Portugal attracting visitors since early 18th century. Some of its beaches are rich in marine life. In 2016, all its coastline were blue flag beaches, including all the urban area from Cape Santo André to the seaport. Most of these also meet criteria under "Praia com Qualidade de Ouro" (Gold Quality Beach) attributed by the Portuguese environmental organization Quercus, which is based in stricter criteria, including excellent water quality for five years in a row and better-scoring microbiological tests than those defined by the EU.

Beaches (called Praia in Portuguese) are managed by traditional Povoan families, known as Banheiros who are descendant of fishermen who left fishing for this business some generations ago. These families often exhibit their Siglas poveiras family mark in their belongings, in the same way as the fishermen did. Although most fishermen stopped using family marks, the Banheiros kept the tradition live to the present day.

== History ==
In the beginning of the 18th century, Benedictine monks walked distances to take the "Baths of Póvoa", in search of iodine, considered invigorating, and cures for skin and bones problems throw sea and sun-baths. These monks were attracted by the large amounts of algae that ends up in the local beaches from the sheltered bay to Cape Santo André. By the 19th century, the popularity increased with people from the provinces of Minho, Trás-os-Montes and Alto Douro that arrived by medical advice to cure several health problems, by breathing the air and diving in the rich iodine seawaters of Póvoa, in a popular movement that occurred in the European Atlantic coast since the 18th century.

During the Belle Epoque, this popularity is especially noticeable among the wealthiest classes and, especially, between the Portuguese-Brazilians (the Brasileiros). Several hotels, theaters and casinos opened. It then became the most popular holiday destination in Northern Portugal, Between the 1930s and the 1960s, beach-going became a popular holiday destination for the masses.

== Beach variation ==
=== Fine sand vs medium sand ===
The Northwestern coast beaches are different from those in the southwestern. The south beaches are sided by the urban area, have medium sand, occasionally fine, and with granitic gneiss outcrops. The Northern ones have fine sand, occasionally with cobble in the swash zone, with little to no rocky outcrops and the area is completely dominated by sand dunes and rural.

=== Dissipative and reflective beaches ===
The southern beaches tend to be reflective beaches, and the northern ones are dissipative beaches, and there's transition between both types around the cape of Santo André.

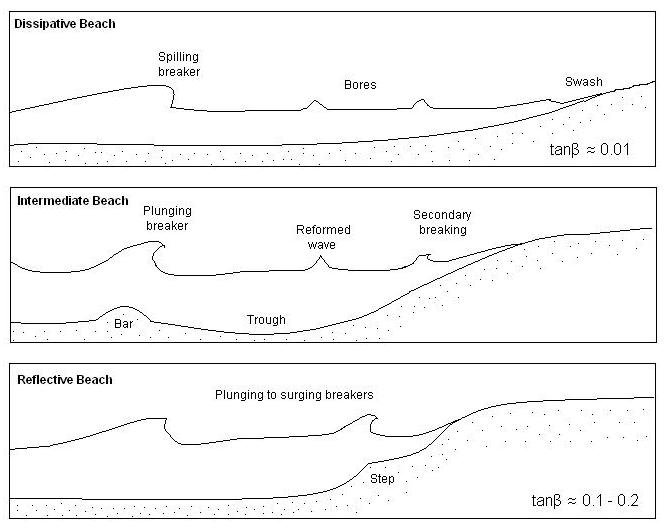
Beach classification showing dissipative, intermediate, and reflective beaches, all present in Póvoa de Varzim.

=== Microclimate ===
The microclimate is also distinct. The southern ones have low diurnal temperature variation, just 4 °C (39.2 °F), while the Northern ones almost double that figure. in the South rainfall is significantly lower, solar irradiation higher and wind gusts from the prevailing northern winds are stronger. Yet, because of the fine sand of the Northern ones, these are more prone to sand blowing and dune transformation and evolution, the southern sands are not.

=== sand dunes ===
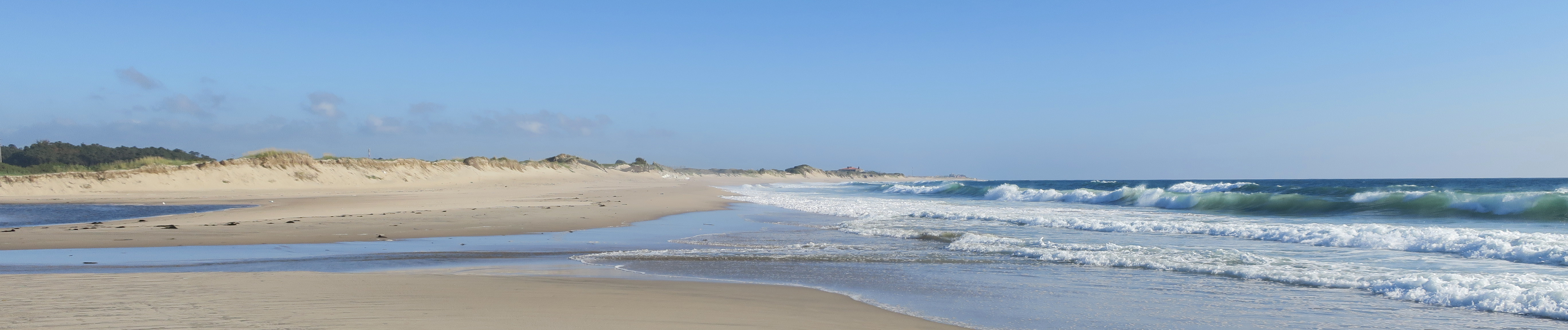
The Primary Dune System of Póvoa de Varzim as seen from Rio Alto estuary. This area extends for over 6 kilometers; 20,000 feet.

The Northwestern coast is completely dominated by the Dune system of Póvoa de Varzim, most of the foredunes are dynamic. There are dune recovery projects by the Portuguese Agency of the Environment, the Agência Portuguesa do Ambiente in areas where human activity was disruptive, including rehabitation of foredunes, using dune regenerators and grey dune preservation. Some foredunes suffered from Coastal erosion and, in an area, it was necessary to use sandbags to save it from collapsing.

The grey dunes ecosystems suffered significant damage due to human activity, agriculture or housing. The remaining sites are protected: including the Rio Alto grey dunes, near the estuary of Rio Alto in the civil parish of Estela, and Barranha grey dunes, in Aguçadoura, the late is open for visitation using boardwalks.

Sand dune ecosystems

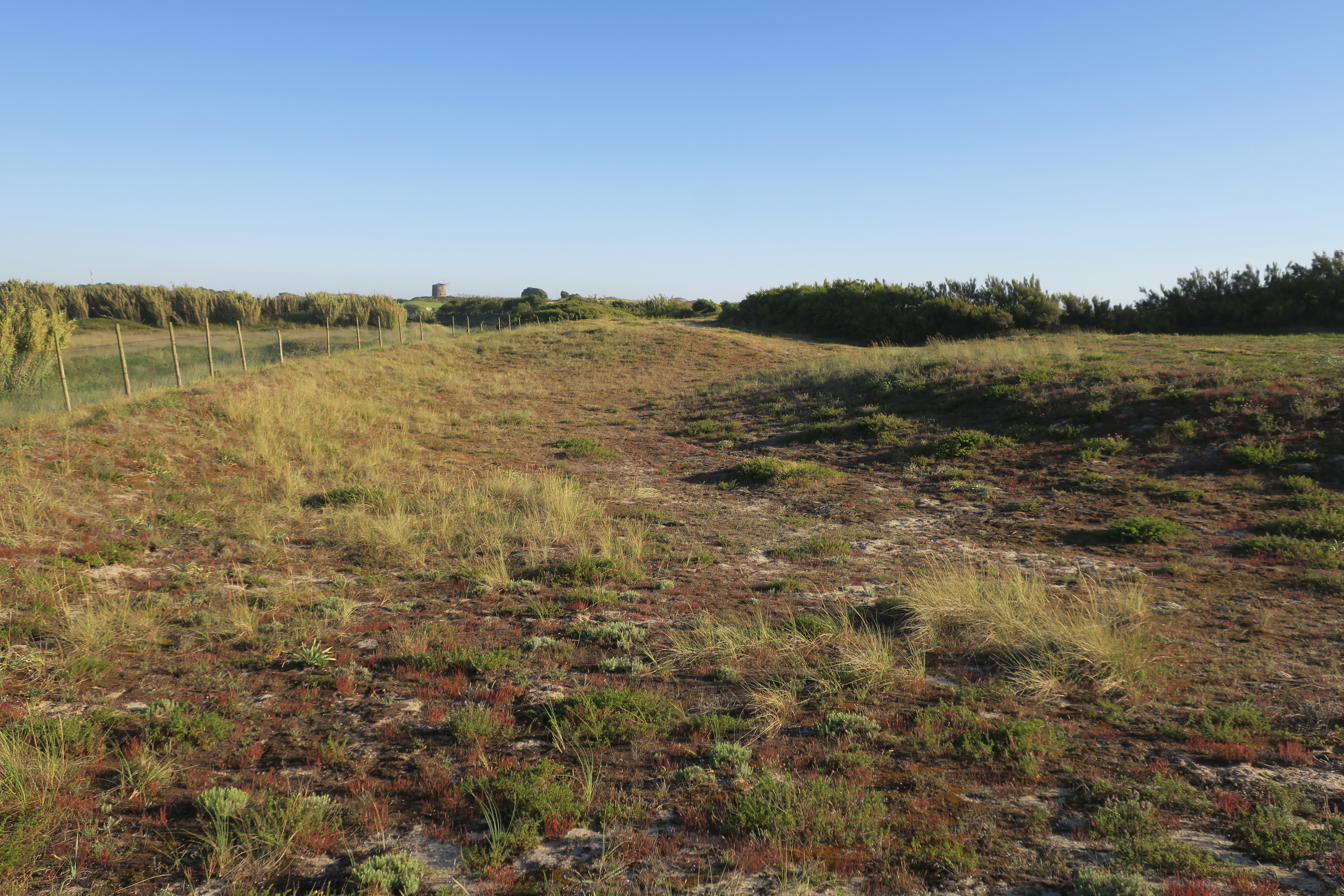
Rio Alto Grey dune, north of Estela Golf course.

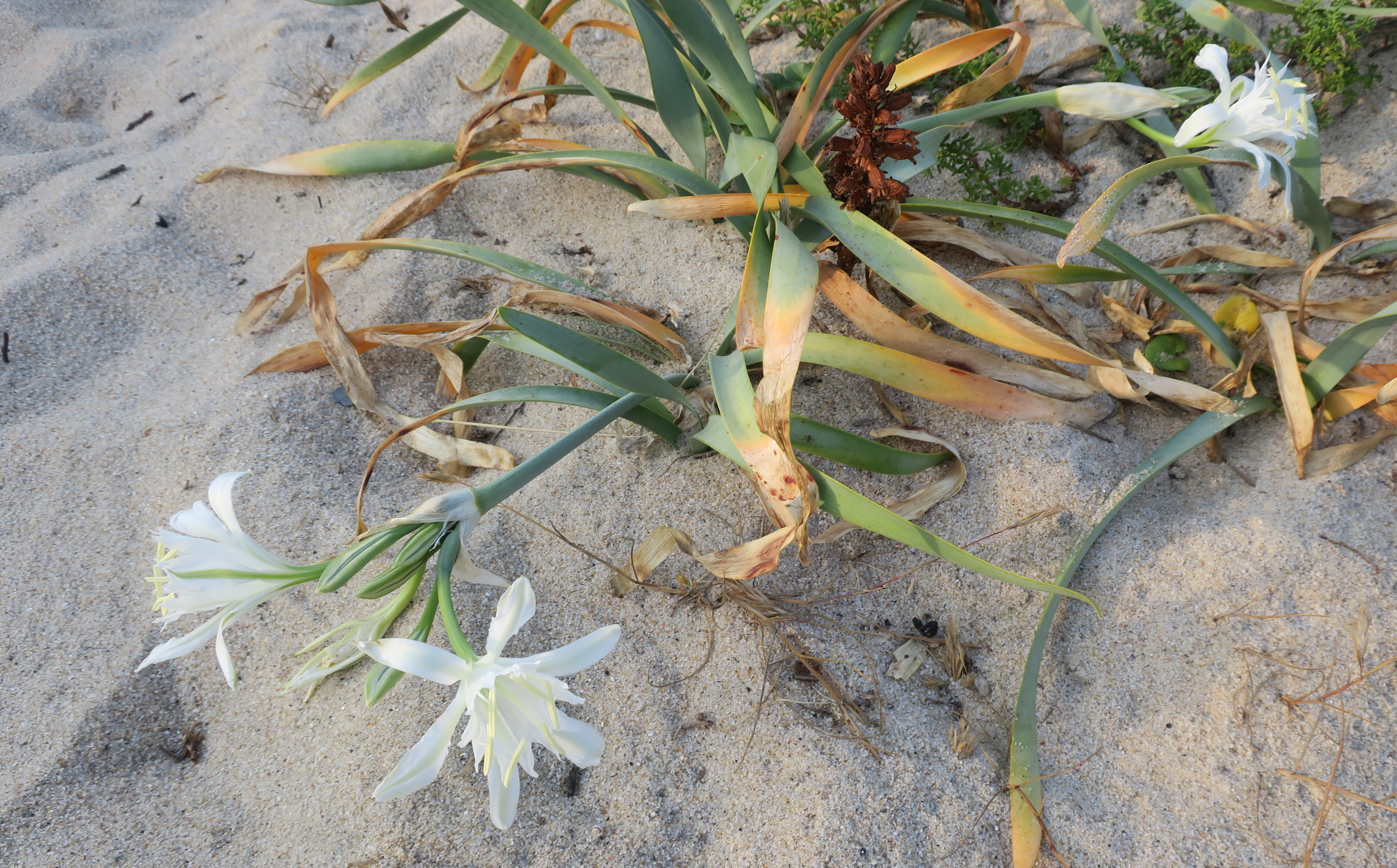
Sand lily in a foredune, Estela.

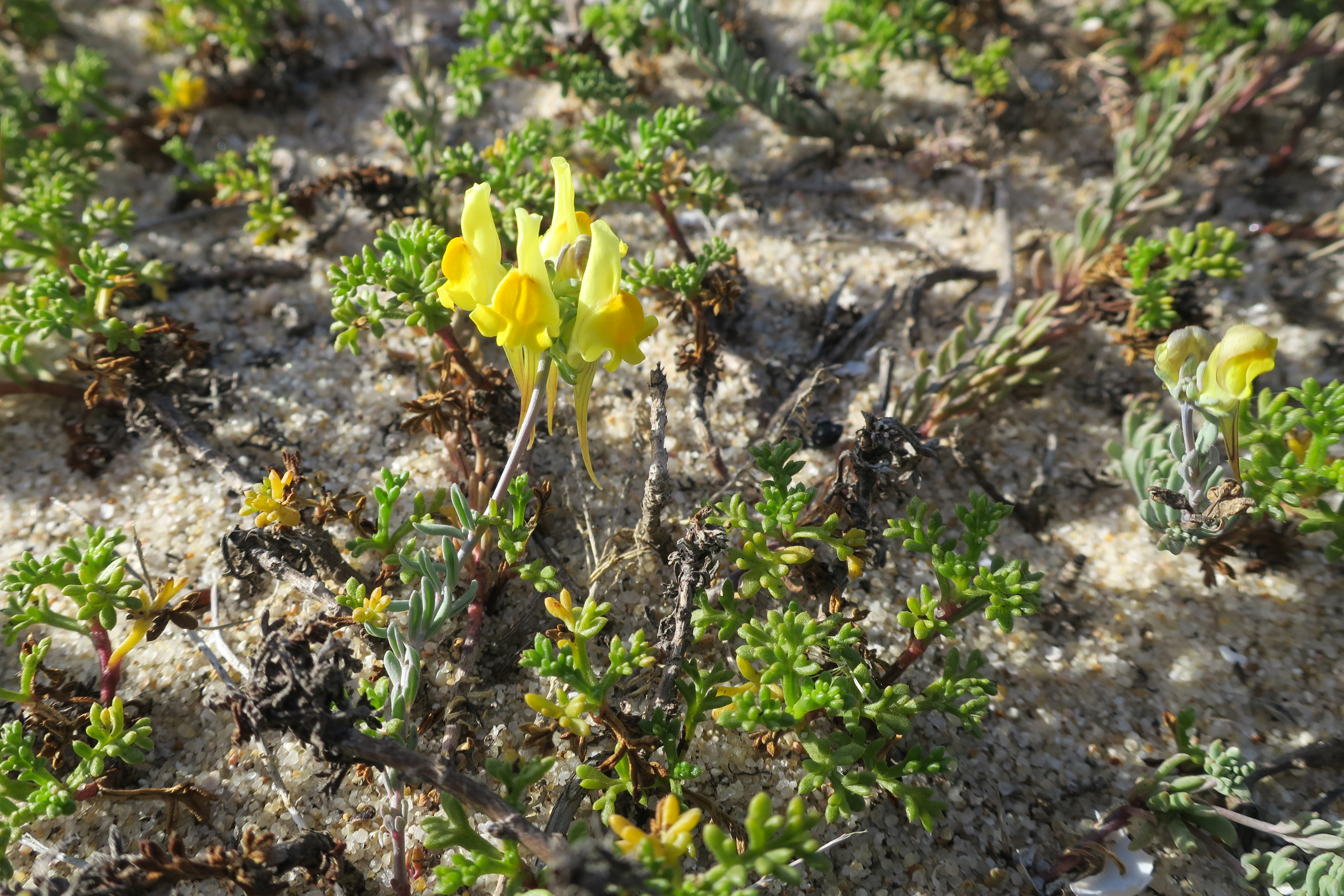
Yellow flower in Barranha grey dunes

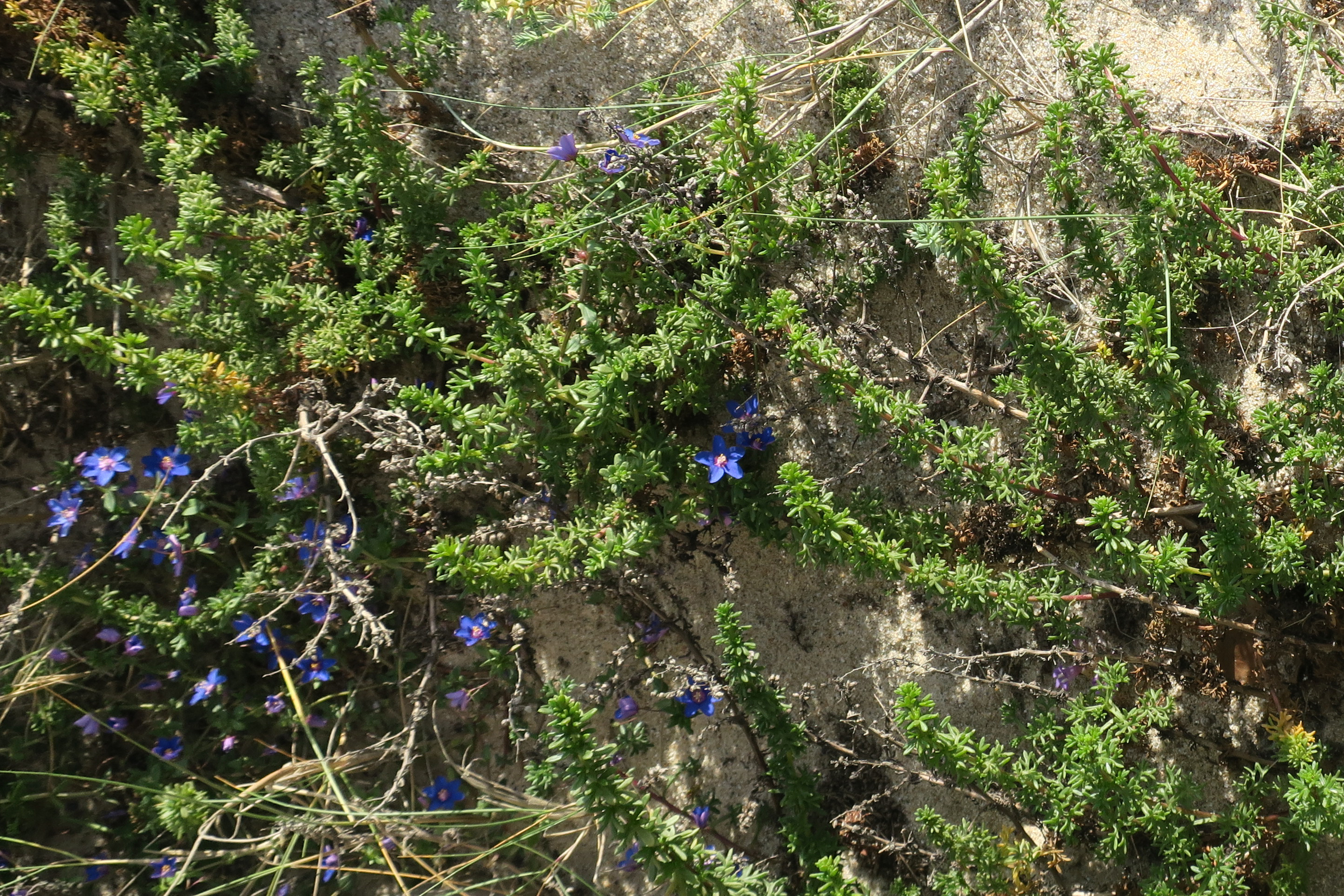
Blue Lysimachia, Orange ones also occur. Barranha grey dunes

=== Rock pooling ===
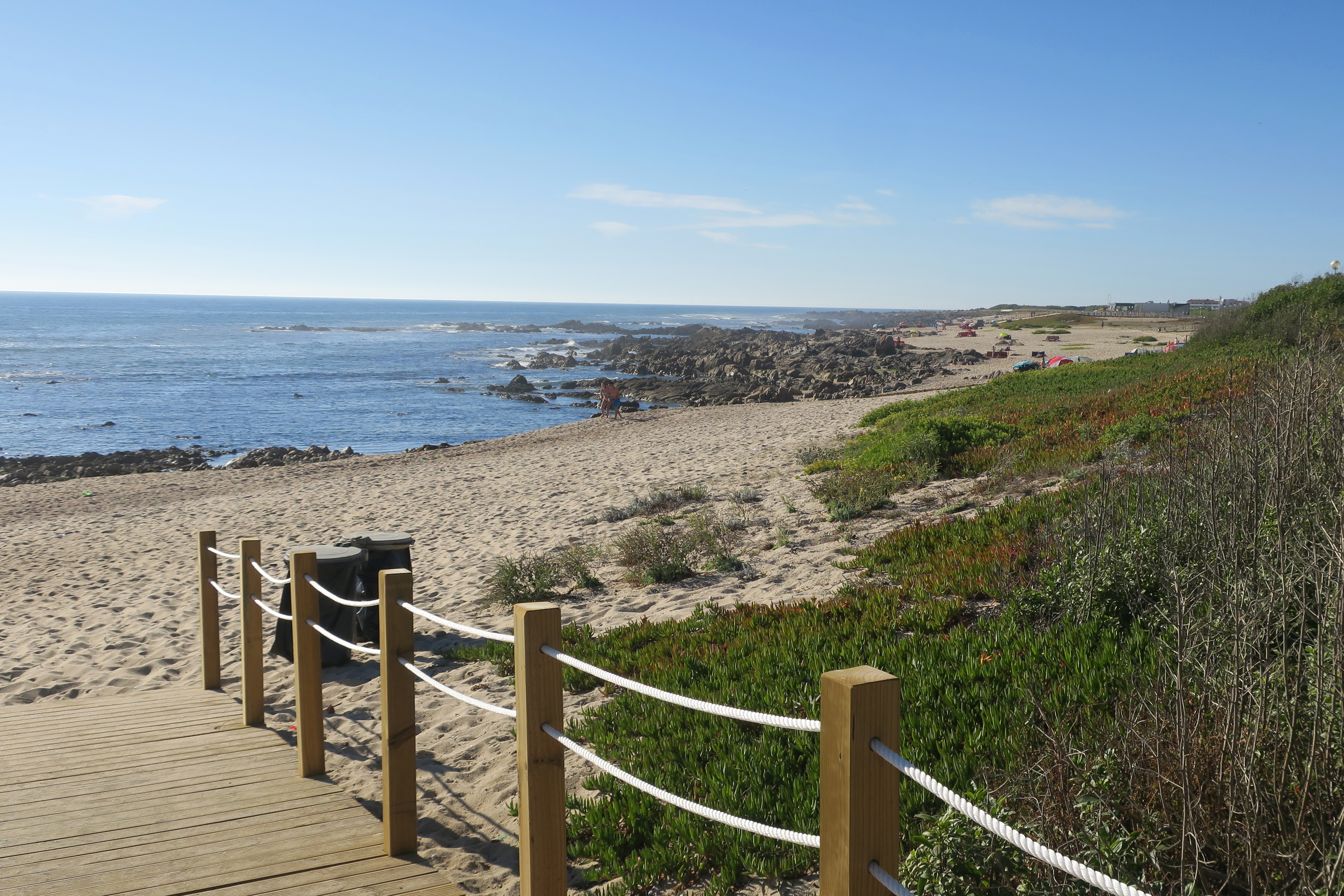
Granitic gneiss and occasional sea spray in Cape Santo André.

The southwestern coast is dominated by a rich marine ecosystem forming natural reefs, these are rich in a diversity of marine life in distinct niches. These reefs and tide pools are supported by the granitic gneiss, the base for these reefs. The Póvoa de Varzim Maritime Police patrols Póvoa de Varzim seafront, including the seaport, beaches and maritime waters under the national sovereignty and jurisdiction. It often acts against smuggling, illegal fisheries, and unruly harvest of shellfish in these beaches.

In Póvoa de Varzim there are subtropical and temperate fish species. Tide pools often only exist as separate entities only at low tide and are habitats of diverse adaptable animals and algae. The most common fish in tide pools are blennies (generally called marachomba), including: Parablennius gattorugine, Parablennius pilicornis, Coryphoblennius galerita, Lipophrys pholis, and Lipophrys trigloides. Other small fish recorded locally include worm pipefish, rock gobies and snail-fish. In larger tide pools, schools of juvenile sargo seabreams, Zebra seabreams, small-headed clingfish, brilliantly coloured and camouflaged wrasses such as the green wrasse, the Common Wrasse and the Ballan Wrasse, rocklings and juveniles of other species of fish are frequently found.

Hermit crabs such as Pagurus bernhardus, Clibanarius erythropus and more rarely Pagurus cuanensis can be found in specific beaches, along with crabs such as Pilumnus hirtellus, Pachygrapsus marmoratus, Xantho hydrophilus, Carcinus maenas, Necora puber, the filter-feeding crab Porcellana platycheles and a number of other species. There are abundant populations of shrimp of the species Palaemon serratus, Palaemon elegans, Lysmata seticaudata and Hippolyte varians (chameleon shrimp).

The most regular species of anemones are: Actinia fragacea, Aulactinia verrucosa, diverse varieties of Actinia equina, Anemonia viridis, Actinothoe spirodeta and Cereus pedunculatus. The giant Marthasterias glacialis is the most sighted starfish, but other smaller species do exist such as purple Asterias rubens, the tiny Asterina gibbosa and the exotic-looking Ophiothrix fragilis brittle star. Paracentrotus lividus is the general urchin locally and has diverse colour varieties including purple, green and pink.

Molluscs commonly found at the local beaches includes the Octopus vulgaris and the opisthobranch gastropods Aplysia fasciata and Aplysia punctata, nudibranchs, and chitons. Other common snails are Patella vulgata, Patella pellucida, Gibbula umbilicalis, Osilinus lineatus, Littorina littorea, Trivia monacha, the predator snails Nucella lapillus and Ocenebra erinacea, the scavenger snails Nassarius reticulatus and Nassarius incrassatus. Two types of mussels often occur, including the extremely common Mytilus edulis and the rarer Modiolus barbatus, along with several other species of bivalves.

Tide pools

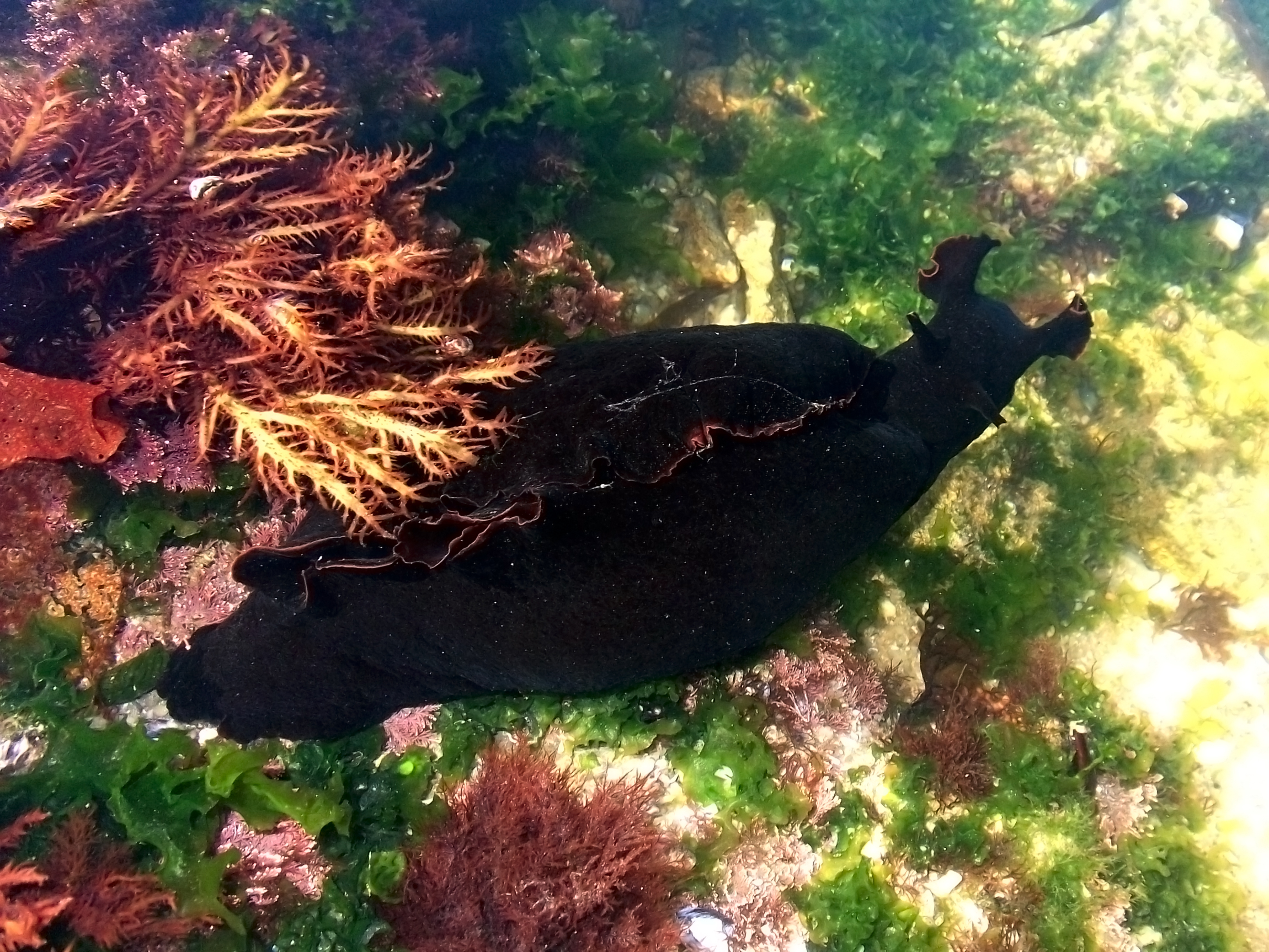
The sea hare Aplysia fasciata grazing in a tide pool

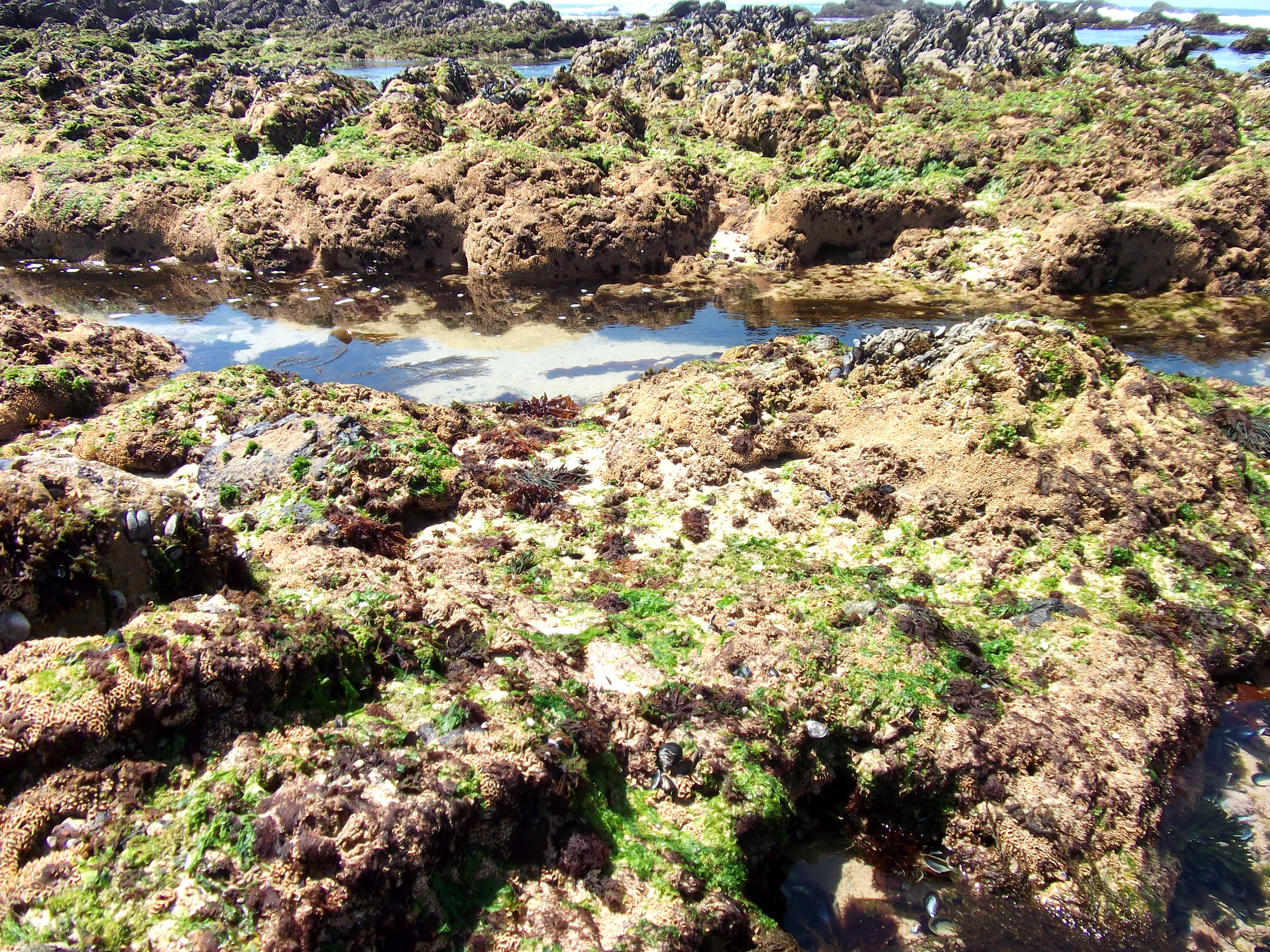
A massive honeycomb worm reef. These reefs are important for the sustainability and diversity of marine life

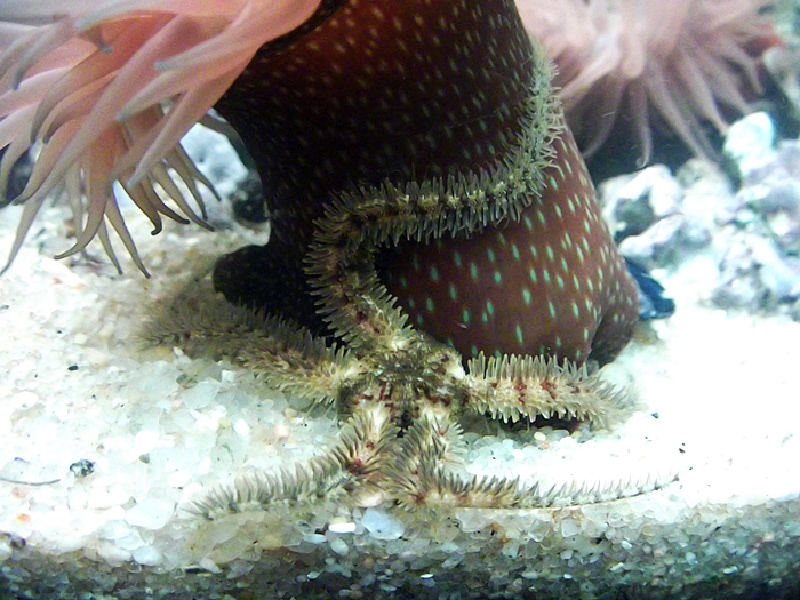
Local tidal pool specimens: Actinia fragacea and Ophiothrix fragilis

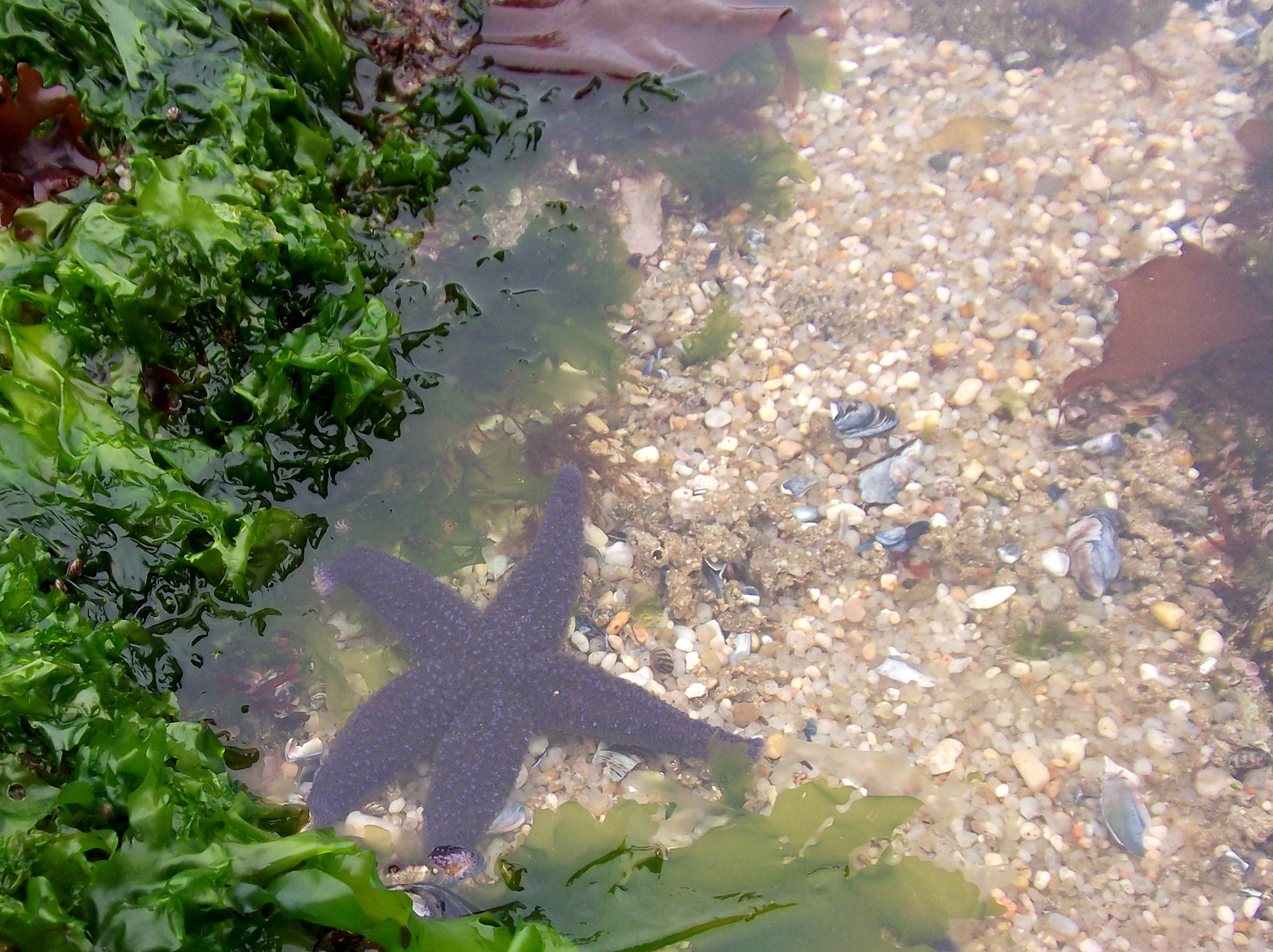
Purple Asterias rubens in a tide pool.

=== Surfing beaches ===
Póvoa de Varzim diversity of beaches provide quality surf spots and distinct surfing experiences in very short distance: along the dissipative beaches of the Northwestern coast, protected by sand dunes in the countryside, or along the southwestern reflective beaches of the city center.

The northern ones are excellent for experienced surfers, have rip currents that add to the surfer experience, functioning as a fast transit, or elevator, between the beach and the waves. However, these are not suitable for novice surfers and may be hazardous to inexperienced swimmers. it is a very large area, where surfing can be done during high or low tide, with swells from northwest to Southwest, with consistent waves that break in the beach without conditioning factors.

In the southern coast, Salgueira Beach is a reflective Beach with swells from Northwest to southwest, with rocky outcrops and people as conditioning factors with a small take-off area in the middle of the beach. In the past, the local surfer community did not allowed beginners or outsiders to use this spot, known as localism in surf culture. Currently the spot is accessible to all. it is very popular among bodyboarders. During high tide, it is suitable for longboard and surf. Nearby Lagoa Beach has a spot suitable for novice surfers.

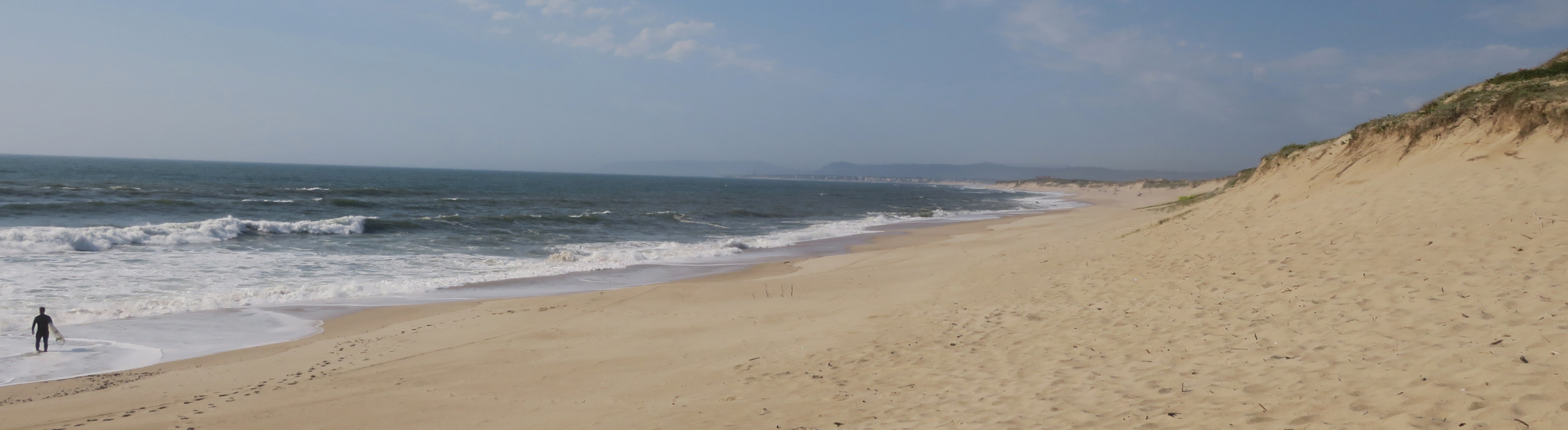
Surfing beach in the northern coast along the sand dunes.

=== summary ===
Blue Flag beaches (2016): Redonda, Salgueira, Verde, Beijinhos Beach, Lagoa, Fragosinho, Fragosa Beach, Esteiro, Coim, Quião Beach, Dois Cabos Beach, Santo André, Aguçadoura/Paimó/Codicheira Beach, Barranha beach, Rio Alto
Gold quality beaches (2016): Redonda, Salgueira, Verde, Beijinhos Beach, Coim, Quião Beach, Dois Cabos Beach, Santo André, Aguçadoura/Paimó/Codicheira Beach, Barranha Beach, Rio Alto Beach
Surfing (best): Aguçadoura Beach, Salgueira Beach, Lagoa Beach
Rock pooling (best): Quião Beach, Verde Beach, Fragosa Beach, Fragosinho
Sand dunes: Barranha Beach, Rio Alto
minor sand dunes: Quião Beach, Dois Cabos Beach, Fragosa Beach
countryside: Barranha Beach, Rio Alto Beach, Quião Beach, Dois Cabos Beach
urban core/beach promenade: Redonda, Salgueira, Verde, Beijinhos Beach, Lagoa
Beach walkways: Fragosa Beach, Santo André Beach
Family-friendly (best): Lagoa Beach, Fragosa Beach, Verde Beach, Salgueira Beach, Redonda Beach
Naturism: Rio Alto Beach
Flirting: Rio Alto Beach, Quião Beach, Dois Cabos Beach, Verde Beach
Gay-friendly: Rio Alto Beach, Quião Beach

== Beaches ==
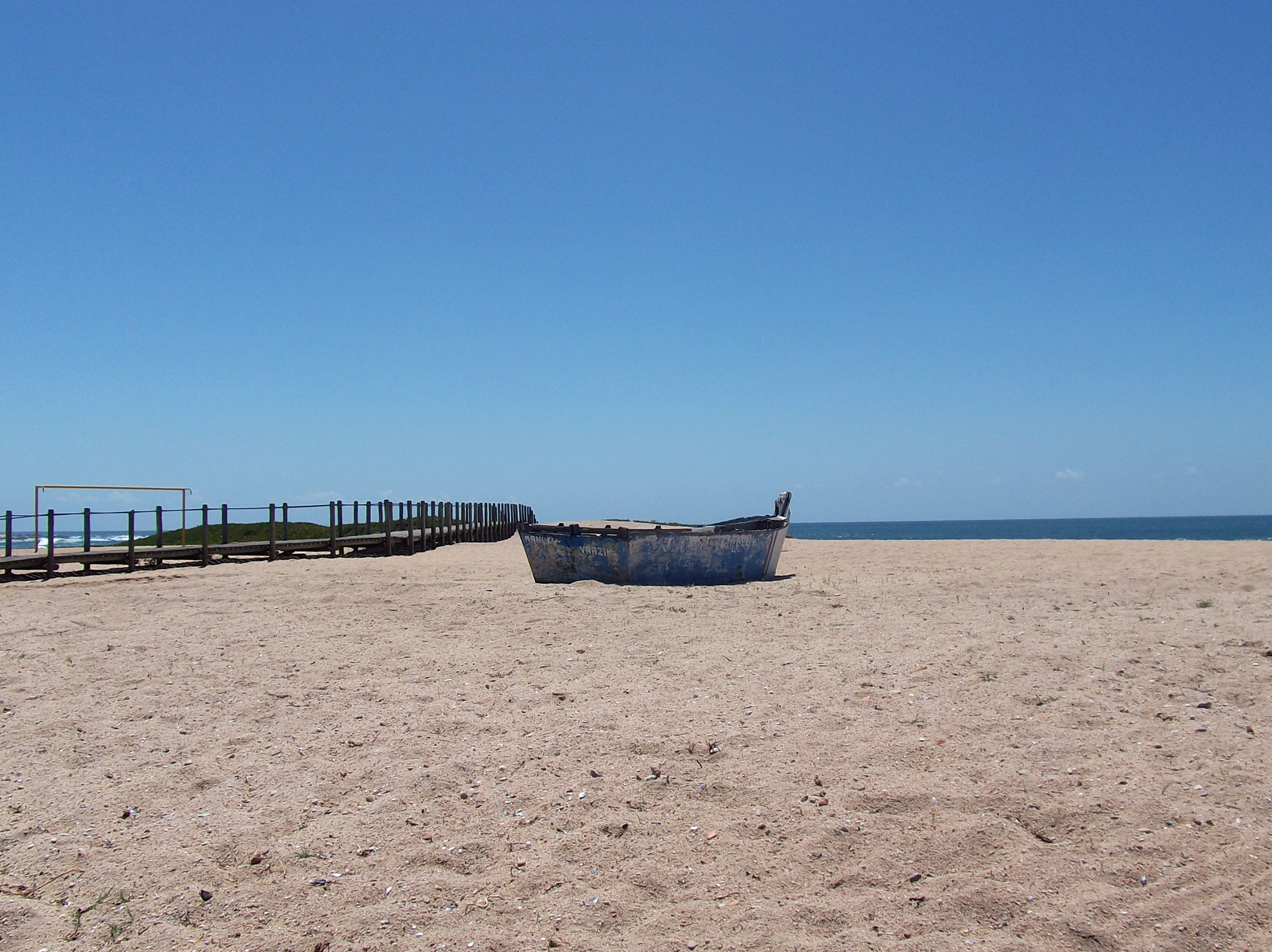
An old Povoan boat in Quião Beach.

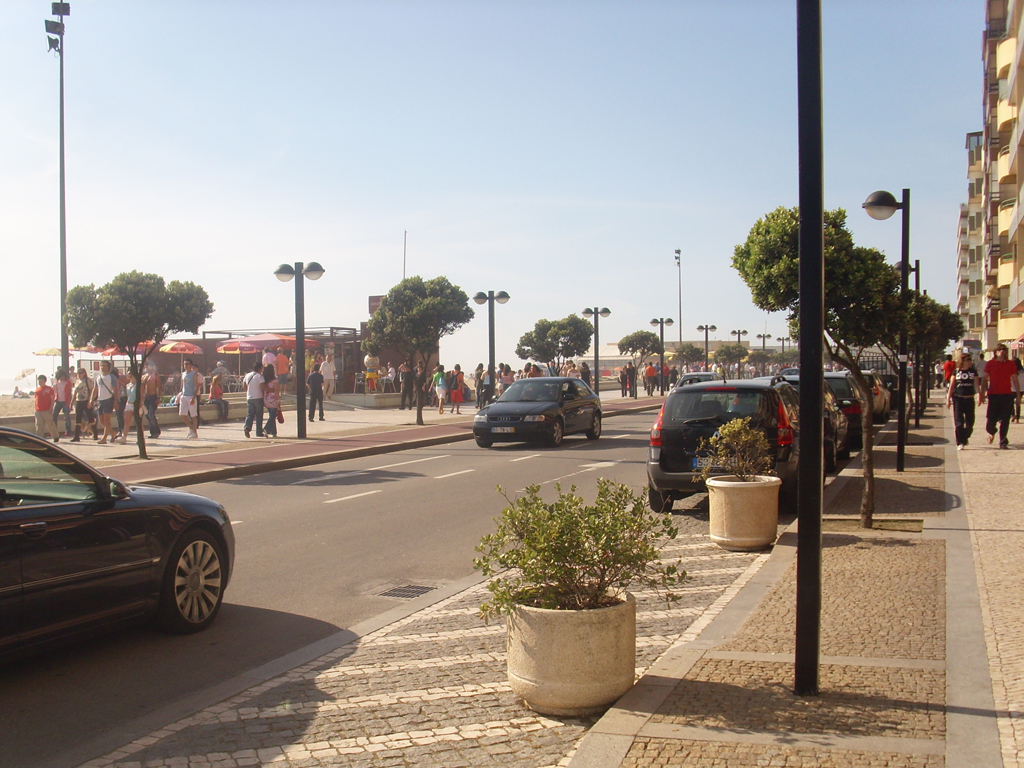
Avenida dos Banhos runs along the main city beaches.

=== Póvoa Bay ===
Currently transformed into the port of Póvoa de Varzim, there are still small portions of the former fine sand beach visible. It was known as Praia do Peixe or Fish Beach.

=== Redonda Beach ===
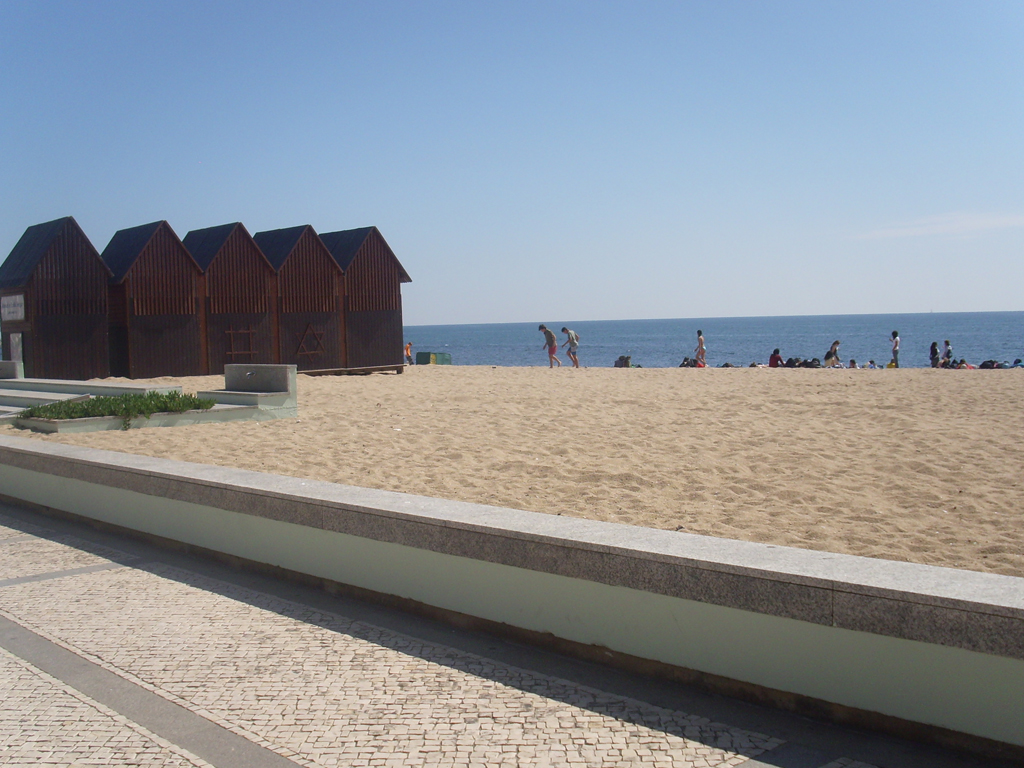
A beach shed at Salgueira Beach.

Redonda Beach or Praia Redonda is a large sandy and family-friendly beach with several beach bars. It is the most traditional leisure beach of Póvoa de Varzim, and still very popular, was known as Praia de Banhos or Baths Beach in the 19th century.

=== Salgueira Beach ===
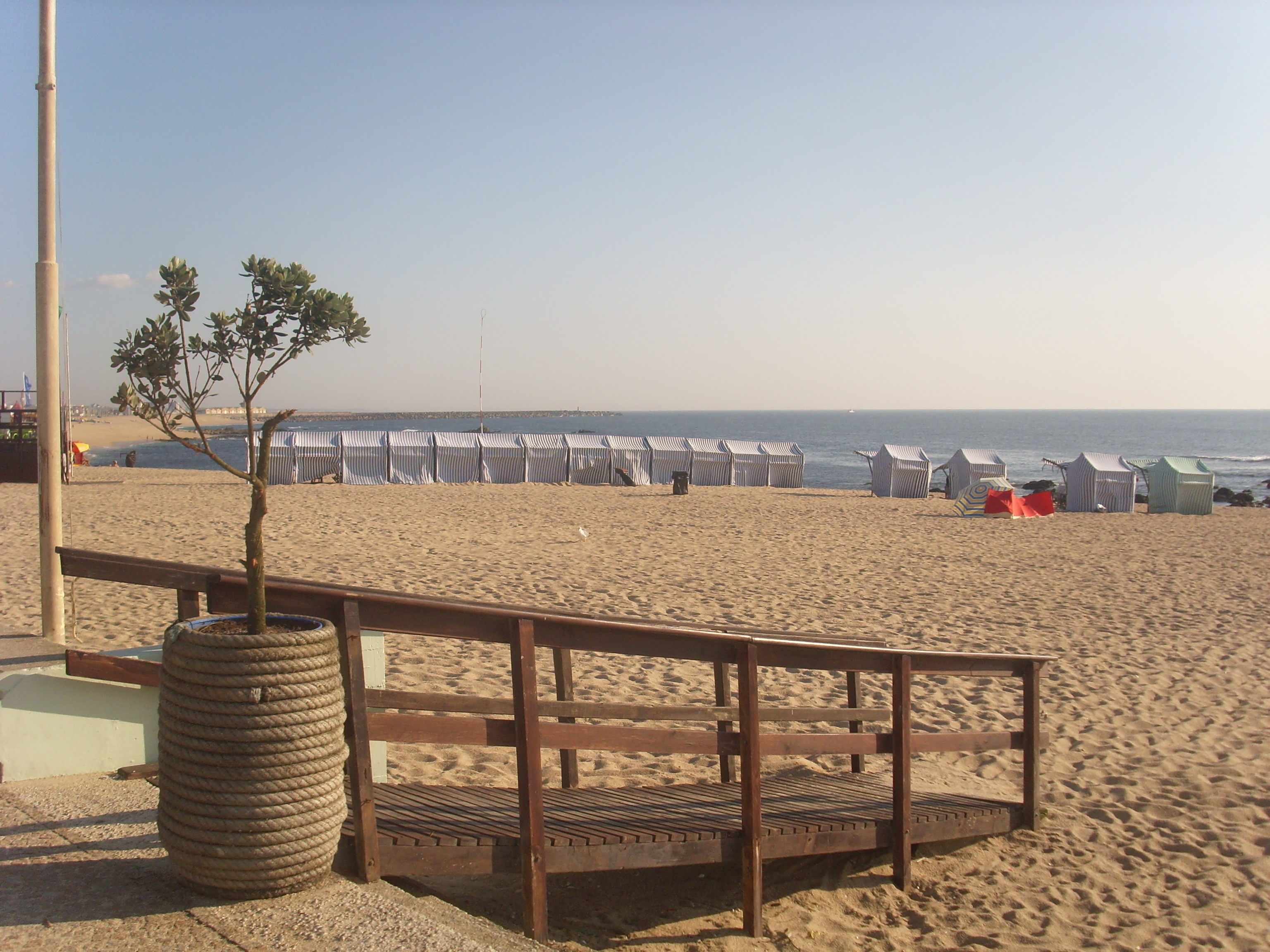
Verde Beach in late September.

Salgueira Beach is one of the most popular beaches in Póvoa de Varzim. It is a large sandy beach, family-friendly, with several beach bars and the main surfing beach in the urban area, especially popular with body-boarders.

=== Verde beach ===
Verde is a rocky beach, rich in marine life and increasingly family-friendly. Occasionally used for flirting by straight and gay couples, it lost prominence for Quião and Rio Alto Beaches in the outskirts.

=== Beijinhos Beach ===
Beijinhos is a small rocky beach in Verde Beach area.

=== Lagoa Beach ===
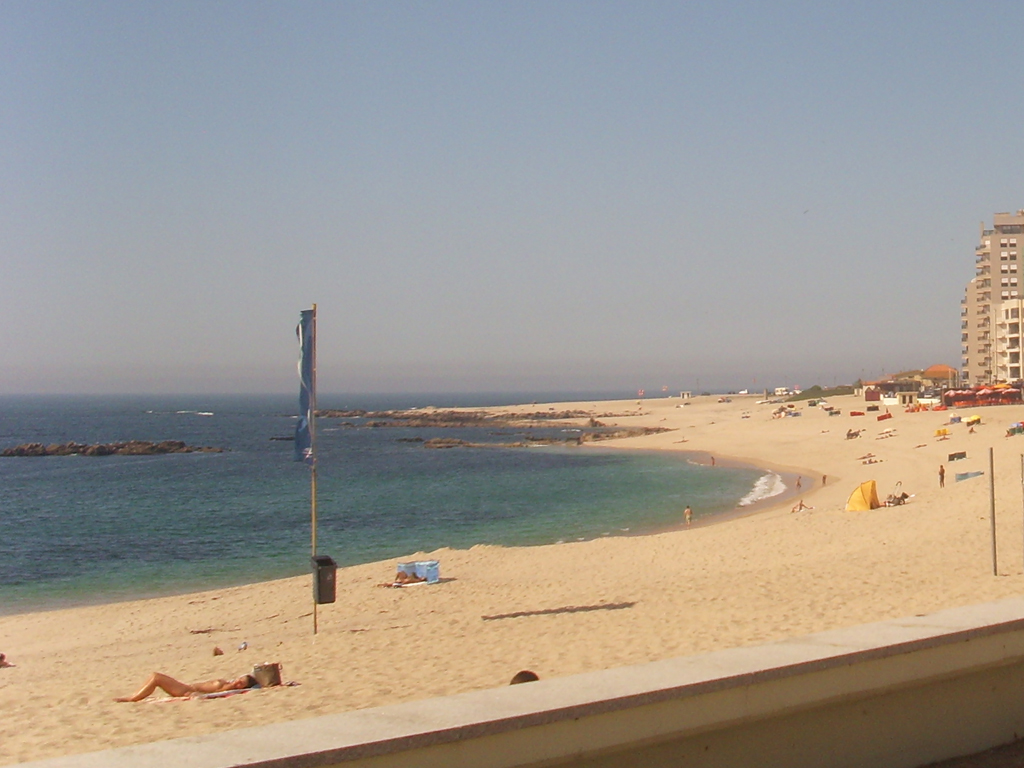
Lagoa Cove in late September.

Lagoa Beach or Lagoa Cove is a large sandy beach located in the high rise district it is the 1970s extension of the tourist area of the city. It is family-friendly and occasionally used by surfers.

=== Fragosinho Beach ===
Fragosinho Beach also known as Farol beach is a rocky beach rich in marine life, it was used as a small port.

=== Fragosa Beach ===
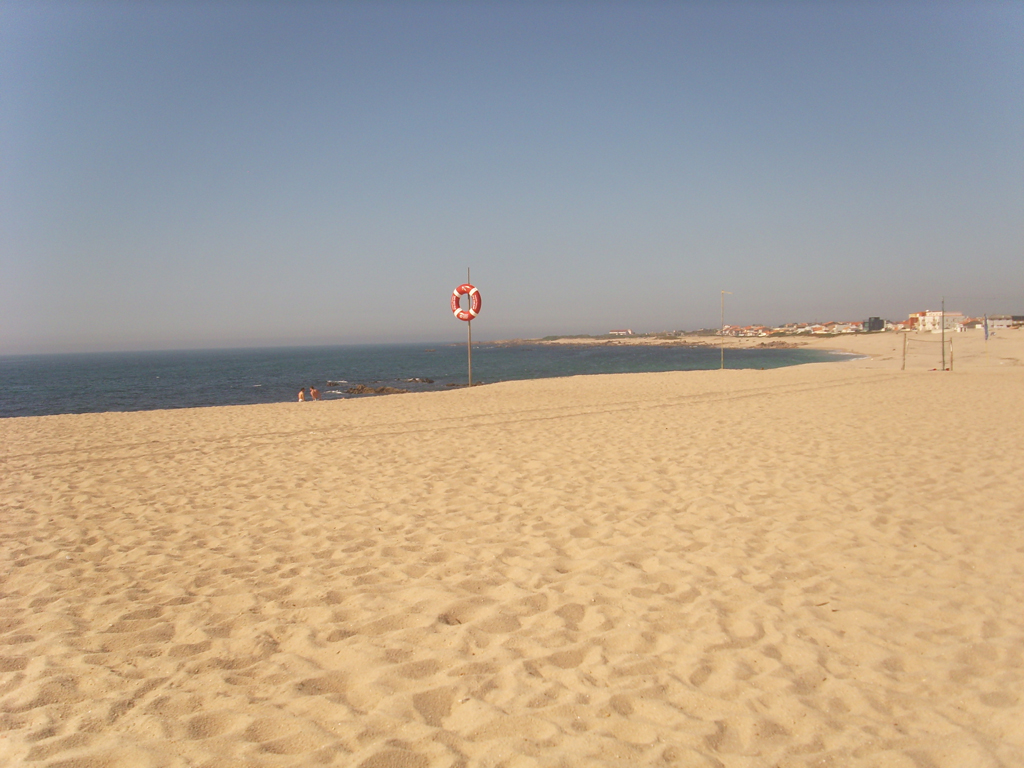
Fragosa Beach in Aver-o-Mar Cove.

Fragosa Beach is a large sandy beach located in Aver-o-Mar Cove.

=== Esteiro Beach ===
Esteiro Beach is a large sandy beach used for traditional sun-drying of seaweed.

=== Coim Beach ===
Coim Beach is an extensive sandy beach with some rocks.

=== Quião Beach ===
Quião Beach is a rocky beach, rich in marine life, with some dunes remaining, and a fine sand beach. Used for traditional sun-drying of seaweed. Located south of Santo André Cape.

=== Dois Cabos Beach ===
Dois Cabos Beach is a tiny beach between the large rocks which form Santo André Cape. Hassle-free.

=== Santo André Beach ===
Santo André Beach is a large beach located north of Santo André Cape. Hassle-free.

=== Aguçadoura Beach ===
Aguçadoura is an extensive sandy beach popular amongst Northern Portuguese and Northern Spanish surfers and considered a high-quality surfing beach, during high or low-tide, with consistent waves that break at the beach without obstacles. Hassle-free.

=== Barranha Beach ===
Preserved sand dunes area. while much of the Povoan coast was made out of dunes, the action of man destroyed most. Hassle-free, used for flirting.

=== Rio Alto Beach ===
Used for naturalism and flirting. Hassle-free, with dunes with native vegetation. Very large and extensive fine sand beach. Part of the beach is a links golf course.
