= Coim Beach =

Beach in Póvoa de Varzim, Portugal

Coordinates: 41.40257°N 8.77908°W

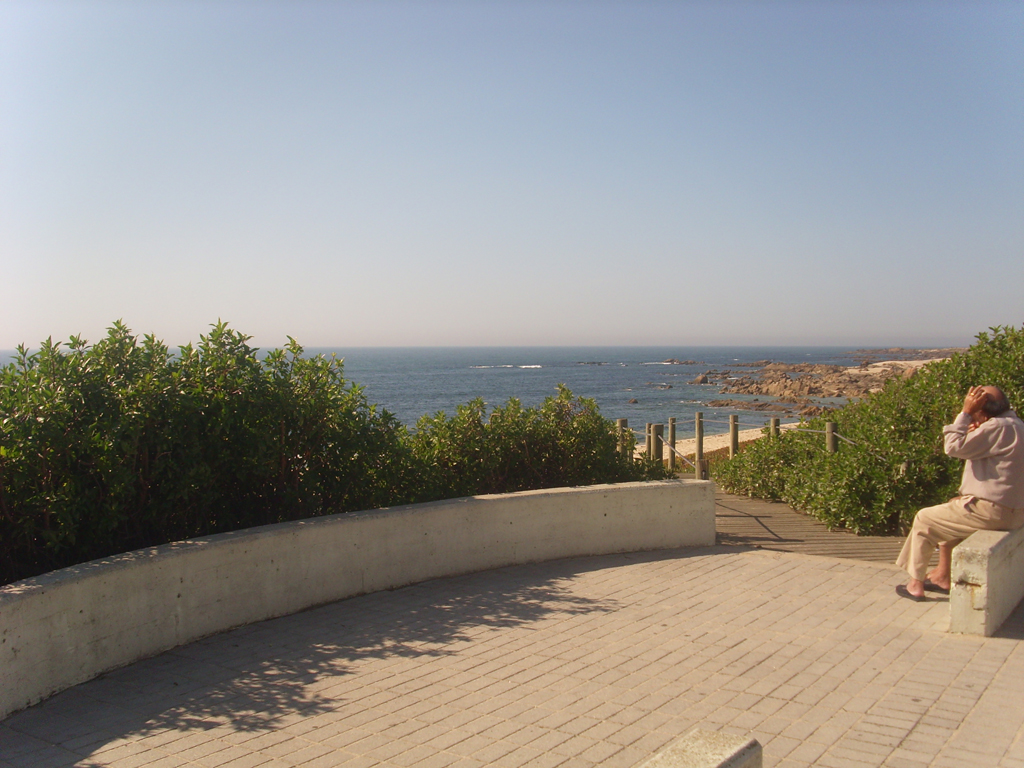
Coim Beach in Northern Aver-o-Mar.

Coim Beach (Praia de Coim) or Coin Rock Beach (Praia do Penedo de Coim) is a maritime beach of Póvoa de Varzim, Portugal, in the civil parish of A Ver-o-Mar, located between Esteiro Beach and Quião Beach.
