= Rio Alto Beach =

Beach in Portugal

Coordinates: 41.445059°N 8.779385°W

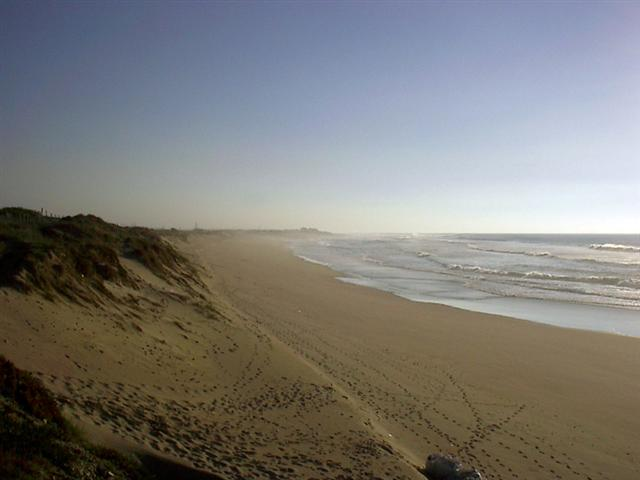
Rio Alto Beach in Estela

Rio Alto Beach (Praia do Rio Alto in Portuguese, lit. "High River Beach"; sometimes known as Estela Beach) is a beach located in the outskirts of Póvoa de Varzim in Portugal.

The beach is located in the civil parish of Estela, the farming area of Póvoa de Vazim. It is regarded as the central focal point of naturism in northern Portugal despite not having official status; although a group attempted for the official status.

Strong northern winds, Atlantic cold water and lack of nearby services make it a suitable place for Portuguese local naturists in a region where the practice of naturism is still underdeveloped. The beach has a car parking space in Rua Campo de Futebol street.
