= Lagoa Beach =

Beach in Póvoa de Varzim, Portugal

Coordinates: 41.3922129°N 8.7744564°W

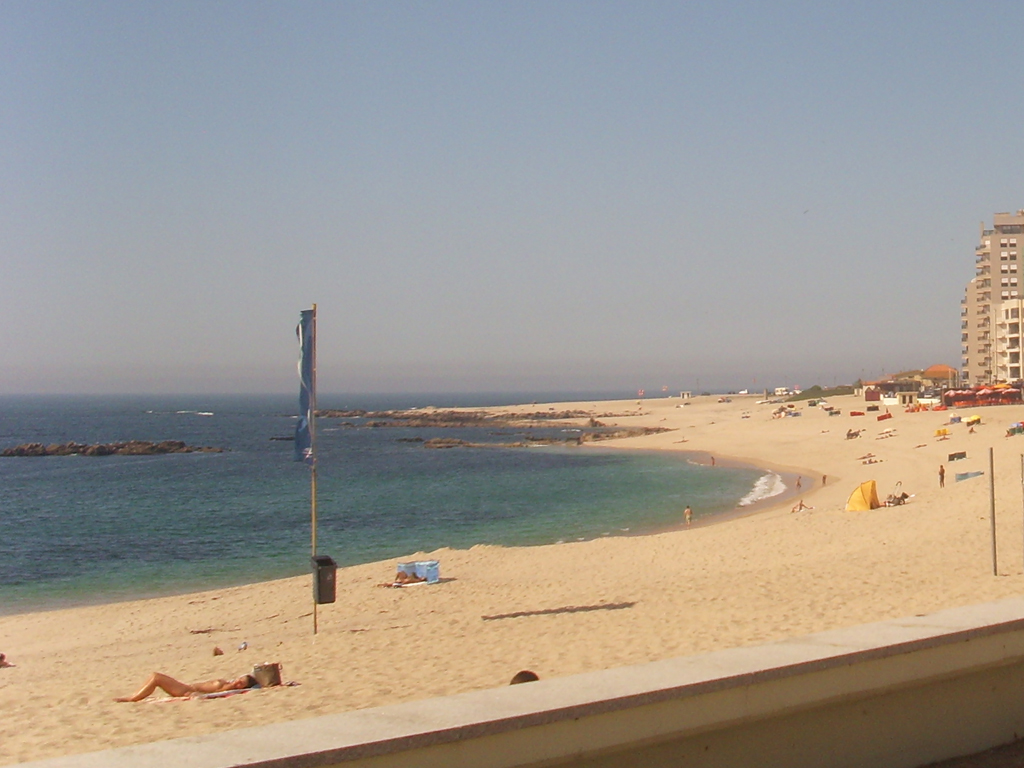
Lagoa Cove, at hotel beach, in late September.

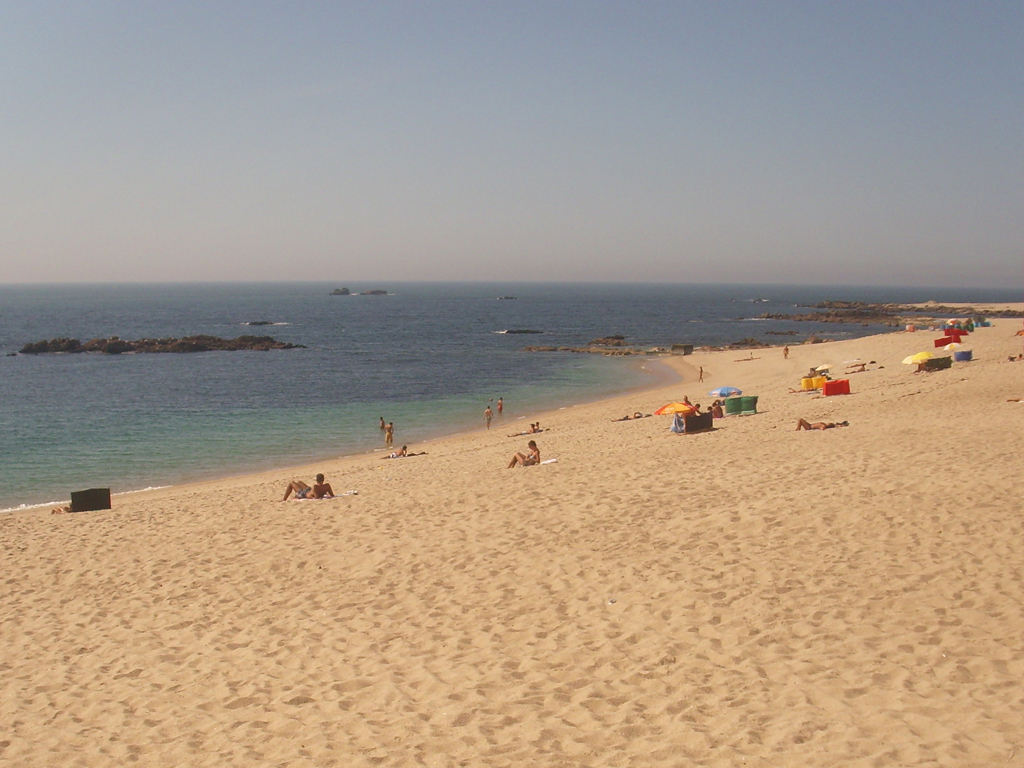
Lagoa Beach with Forcado Islet visible in the background, with elevations similar to a camel's humps.

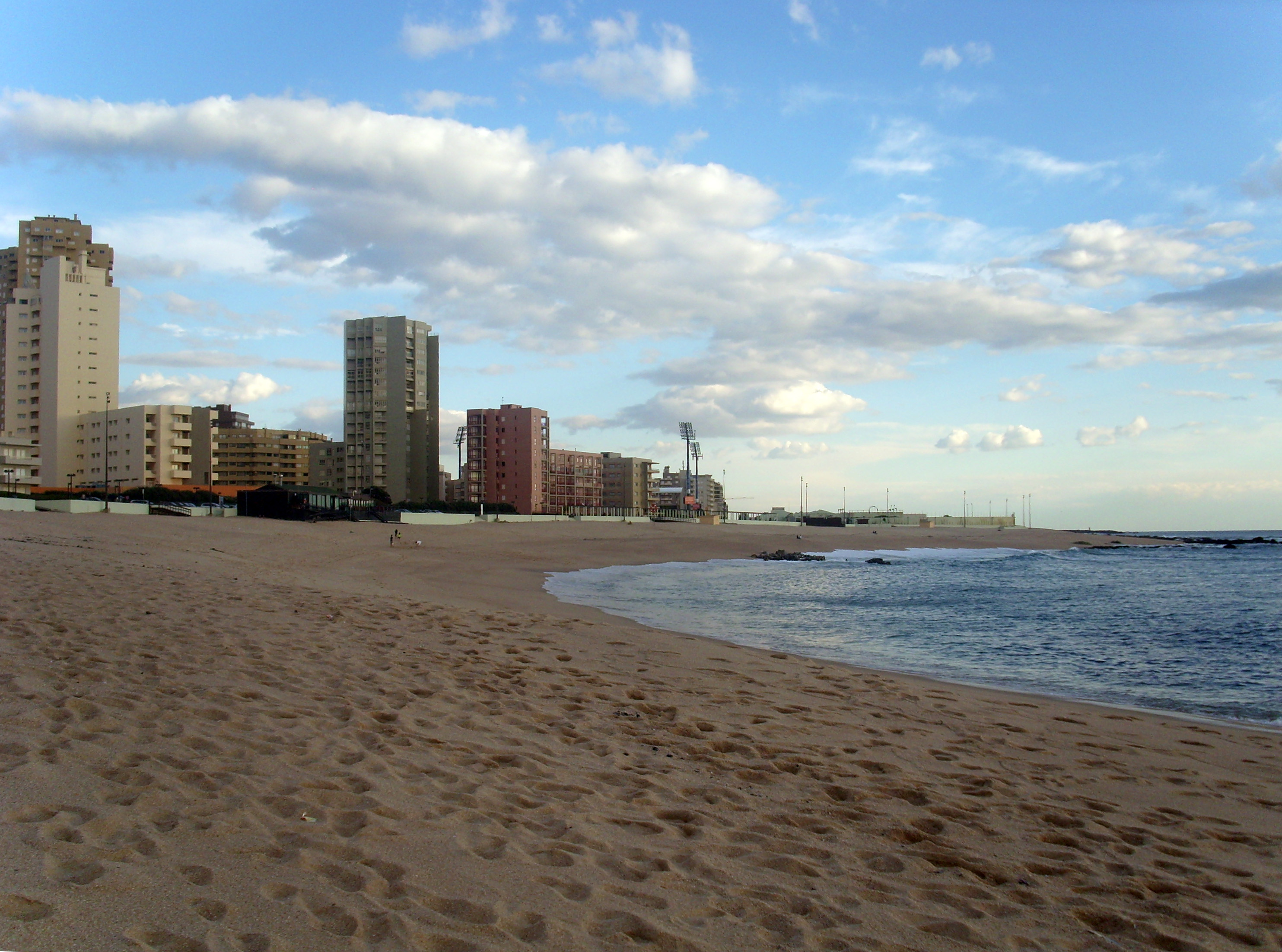
Lagoa Cove is a long crescent-shaped beach and located in the city's highrise district.

Lagoa Cove (Enseada da Lagoa) or Lagoa Beach (Praia da Lagoa in Portuguese, lit. "Lagoon Beach") is an extensive crescent-shaped maritime beach of Póvoa de Varzim, Portugal.

Lagoa Cove is located near Novotel Vermar, and there are beach bars all year-long, namely Bar da Praia and other bars. The beach is very popular in the summer, but very calm during winter. The beach has white sand and no or very few rocks, during low tide, some immersed rocks become islets.
