= Esteiro Beach =

Beach in Póvoa de Varzim, Portugal

Coordinates: 41.4°N 8.8°W

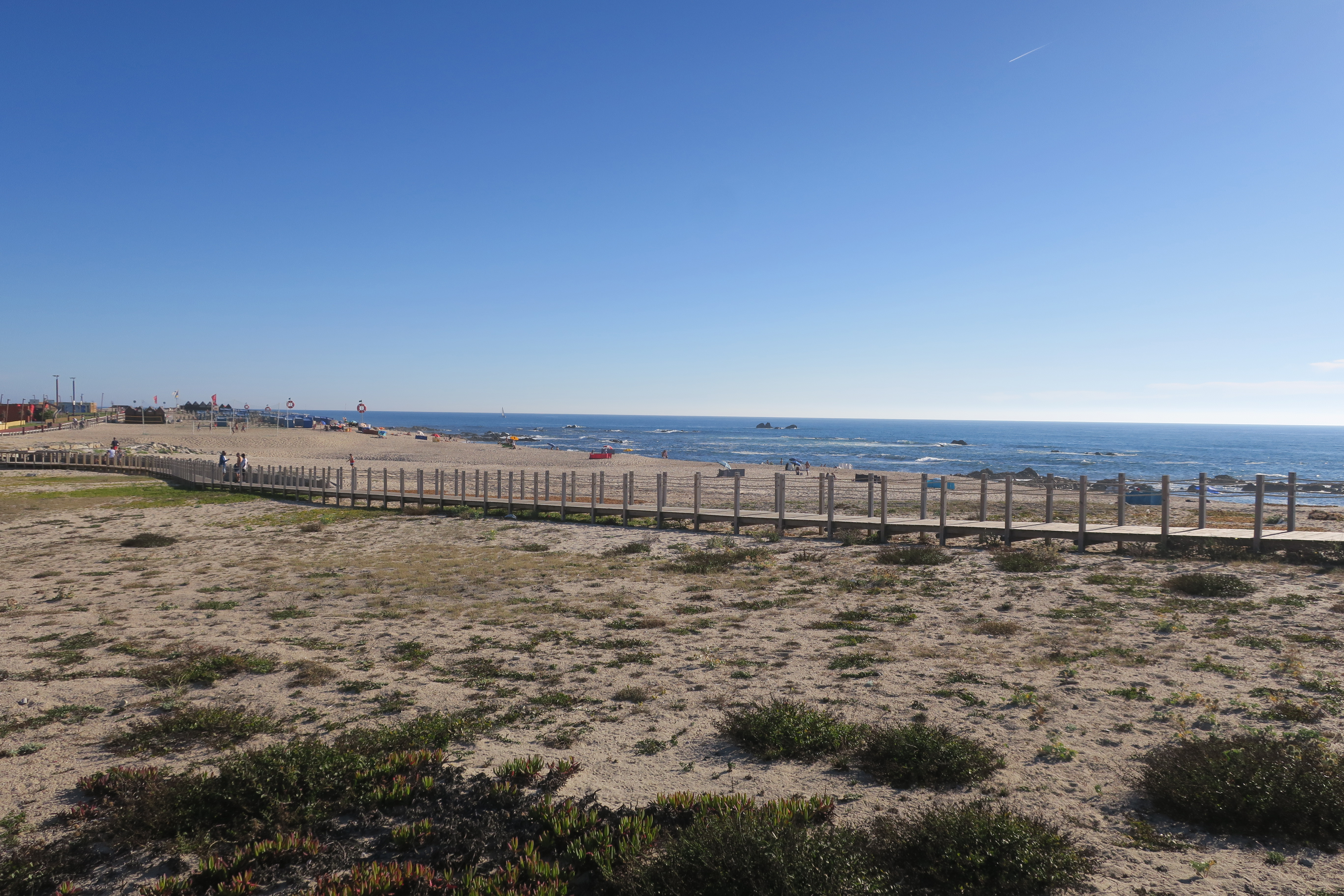
Esteiro Beach's boardwalk allows the crossing of the tidal creek and protects the grey dune ecosystem.

Esteiro Beach or Praia do Esteiro in Portuguese, meaning tidal creek, is a beach on the southwestern coast of Póvoa de Varzim, Portugal, bordering the Atlantic Ocean. It is adjacent to Aver-o-Mar and the beach has medium to fine sand, with a recovering grey dune ecosystem.

The foredune had coastal windmills, some are preserved including the Luisa Dacosta windmill, a famous landmark, and another windmill was currently recovered. Luisa Dacosta was a Portuguese writer from Vila Real who lived and wrote the most relevant part of her work in her windmill where she lived. Luísa visited Póvoa de Varzim since a child for the beach. But she got in love by the beach on the side of the resort, Aver-o-Mar, almost a desert at the time, where she took roots, and her heart was soon divided by the austere Serra do Marão and the coastal rocky outcrops, the Penedaria da Beirada.

Esteiro is located in the right bank of the small tidal channel, known in Portuguese as Esteiro, the other bank is known as Fragosa Beach, with the Penedaria da Beirada and Forcada Islet rocky outcrops. Due to small size, the estuary can be easily crossed during most of the year.
