= Salgueira Beach =

Beach in Póvoa de Varzim, Portugal

Coordinates: 41°22′59″N 8°46′21″W

Salgueira Beach (Praia da Salgueira in Portuguese) is an extensive maritime beach of the city Póvoa de Varzim in Portugal. The beach has white sand and very few rocks, in the central spot with a northern rocky side, near Buddha Club, known as Praia Azul (Blue Beach).

Salgueira is crossed by Banhos Avenue, Póvoa's main waterfront avenue. The beach took the name of a former district and is a classic surfing beach (Póvoa de Varzim spot), very popular amongst bodyboarders, as the waves in the spot are more suitable for bodyboard, but with the high tide it will be good to longboard and surf, suitable for experienced surfers. In earlier times, the local surfer community barely allowed outsiders or beginners to surf in this spot, currently it is open for almost everyone.

The southern tip of the beach is known as Carvalhido near Esplanada do Carvalhido — a beach-square, while the northern tip, near Buddah Club, is known as Praia Azul (blue Beach).

== Geography and Setting ==
Salgueira Beach in Póvoa de Varzim is part of the extensive coastline of Northern Portugal, facing the Atlantic Ocean.

== Images ==
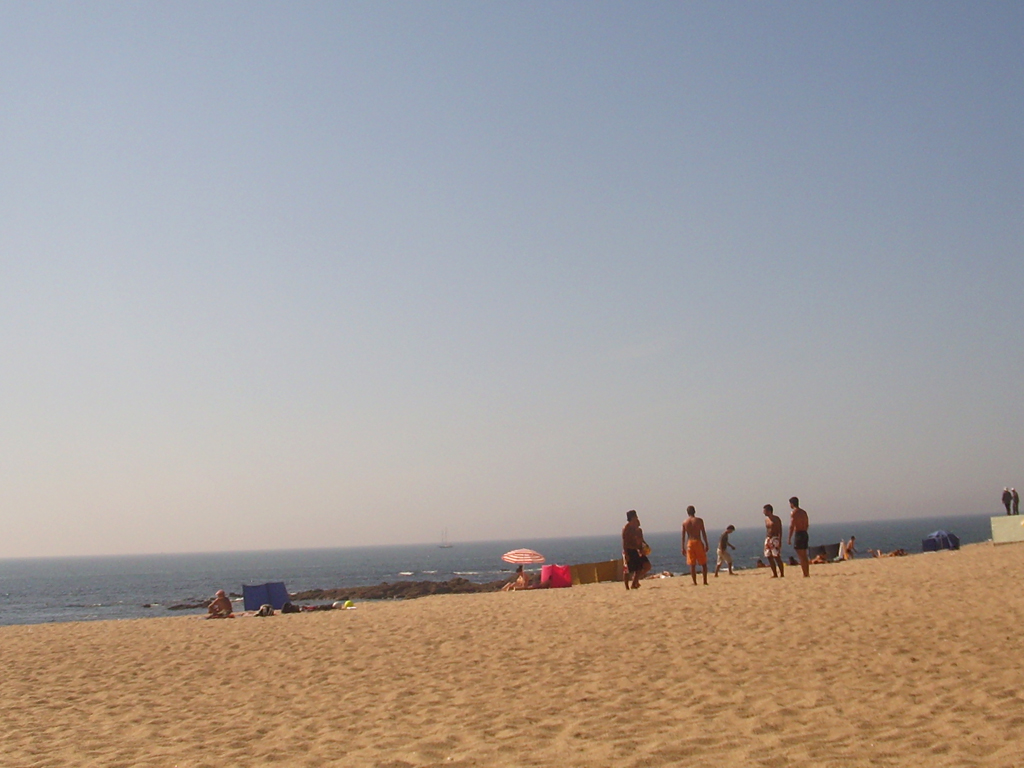
Salgueira, near Buddah Club, in the end of September

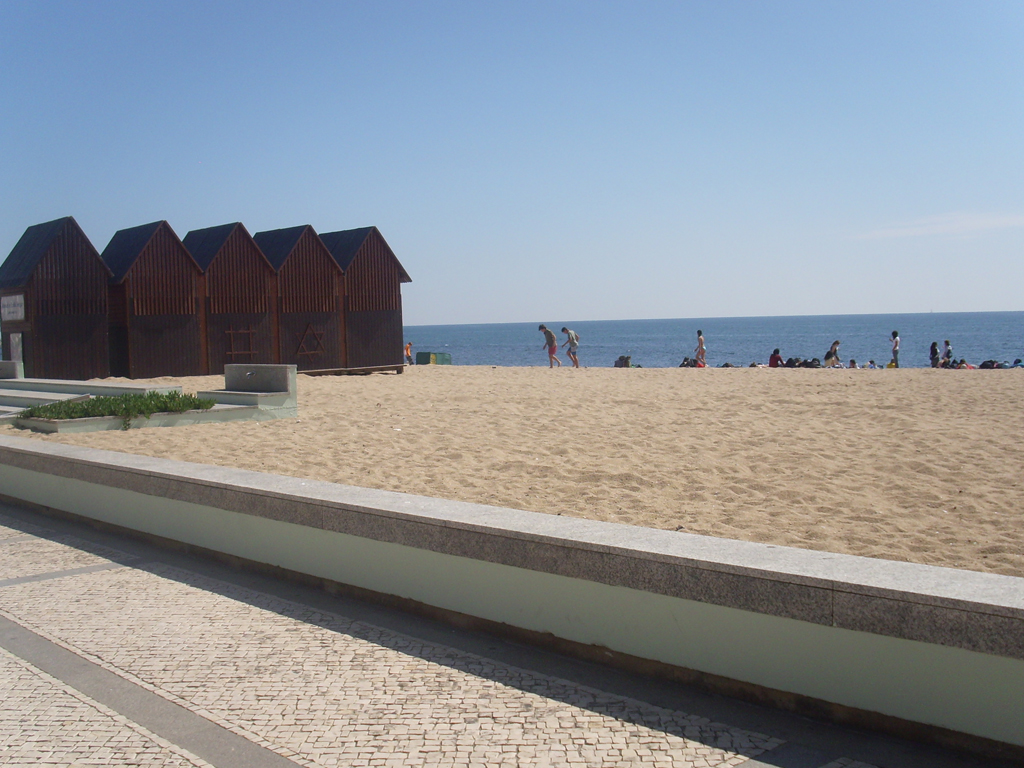
Siglas Poveiras in a beach shed at Salgueira Beach, as viewed from Banhos Avenue sidewalk
