= Santo André Beach =

Maritime beach of Póvoa de Varzim, Portugal

Coordinates: 41.4167°N 8.7872°W

Santo André Beach (Portuguese: Praia de Santo André, lit. "Saint Andrew Beach") is an extensive and wide maritime beach of Póvoa de Varzim, Portugal. It is located in Santo André, between the A Ver-o-Mar and Aguçadoura. It borders Cape Santo André to the south.

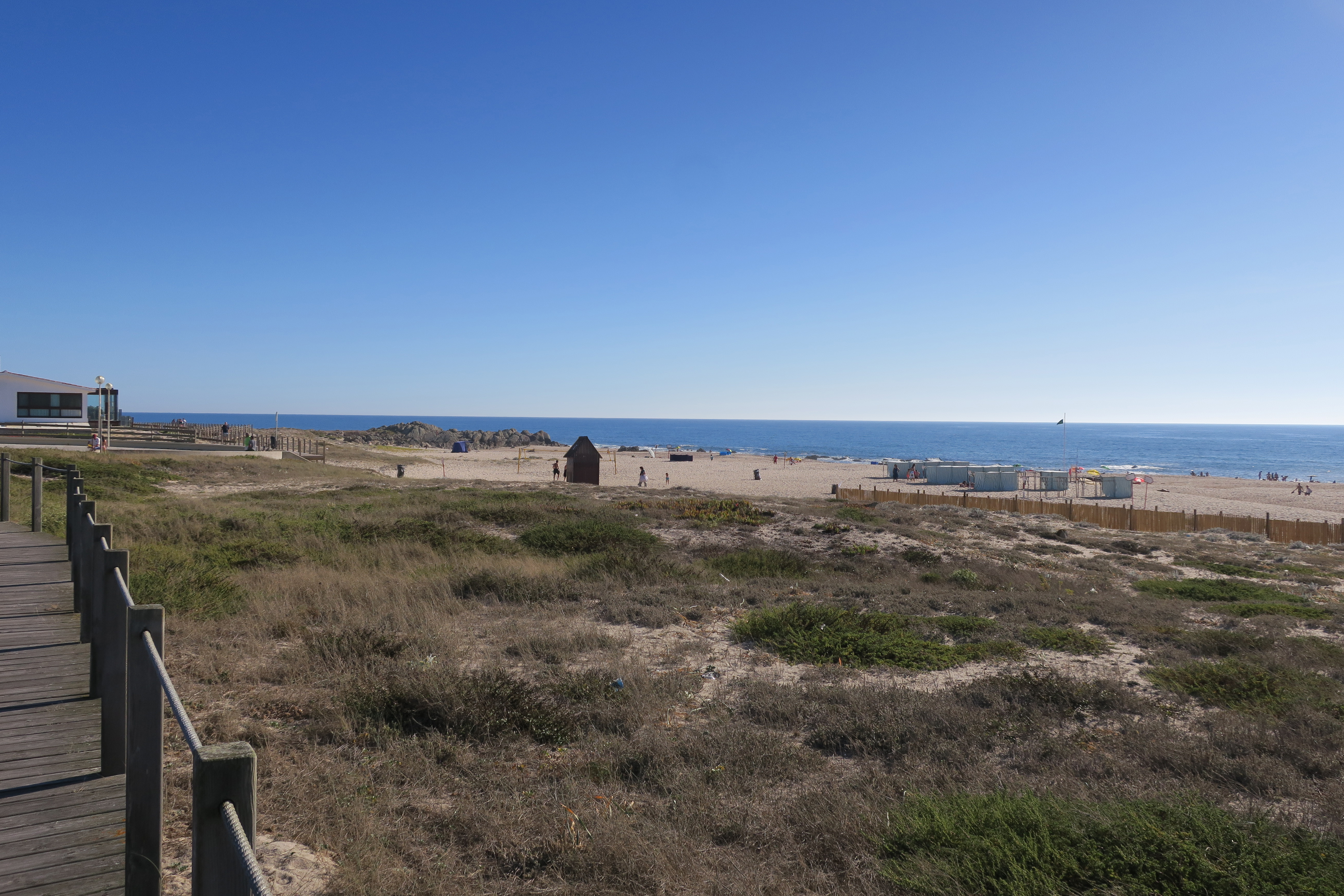
Coastal Dunes recovery project by governmental agencies.

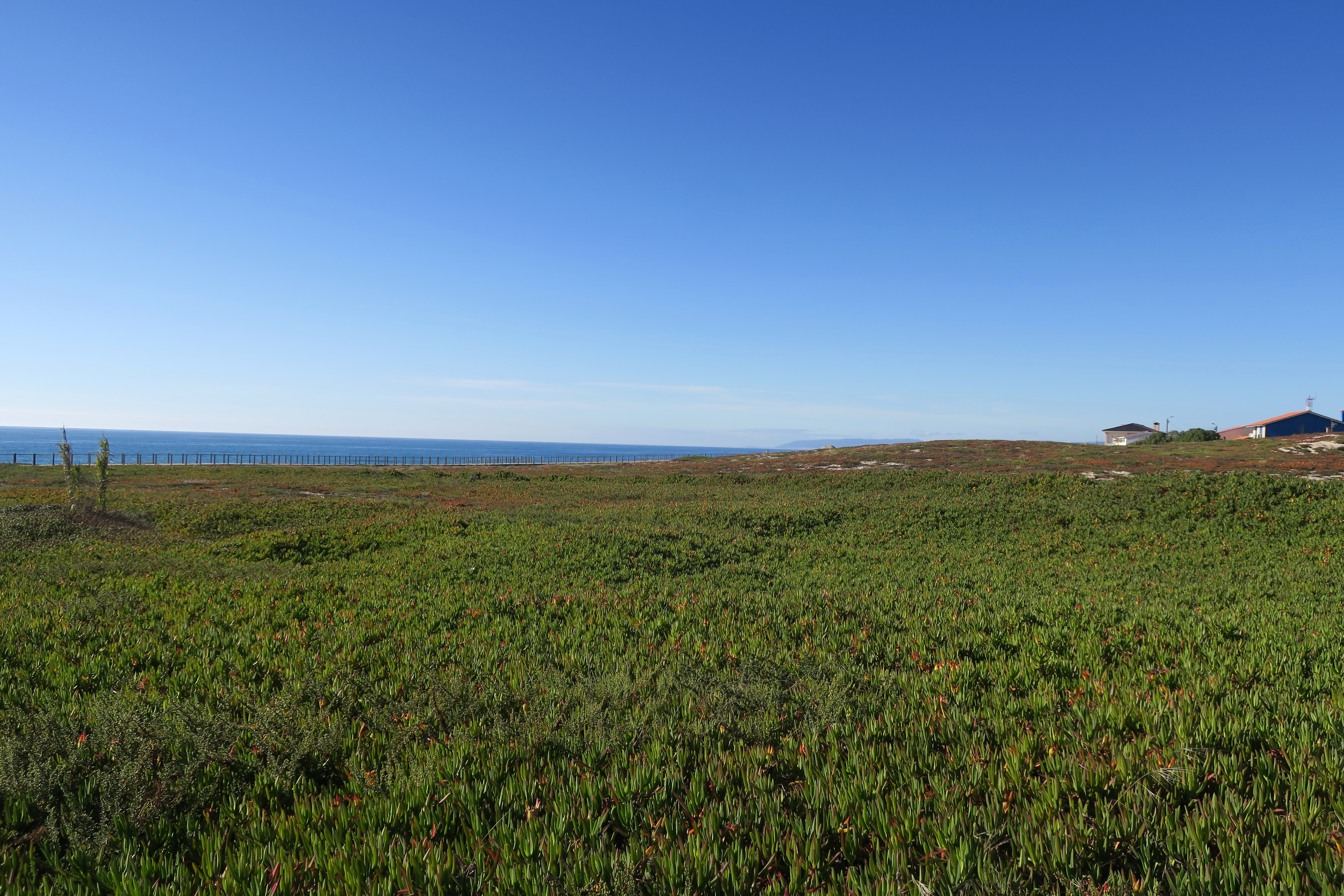
View from the parking area in Santo André Avenue.

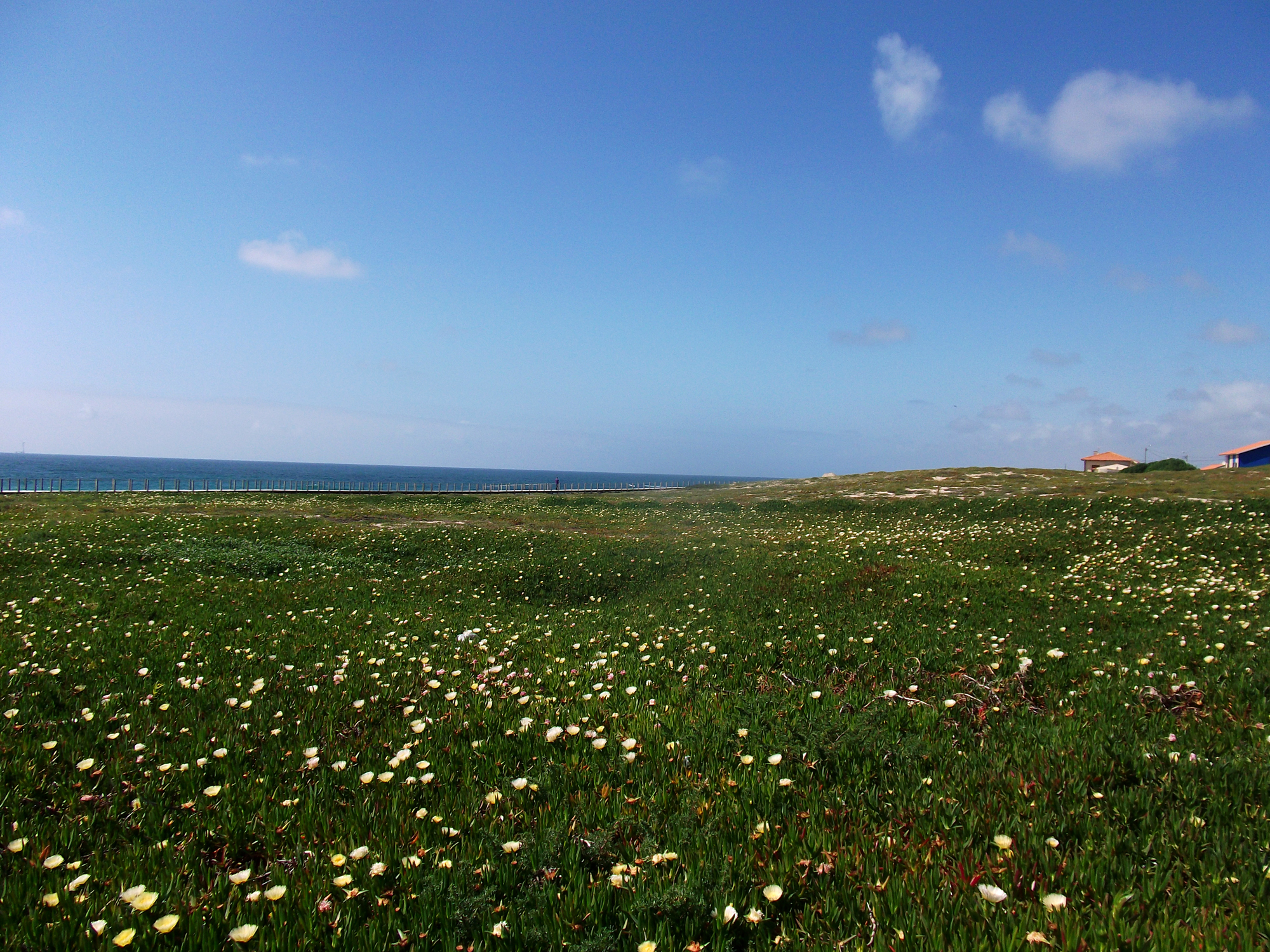
Ice plant blossoming

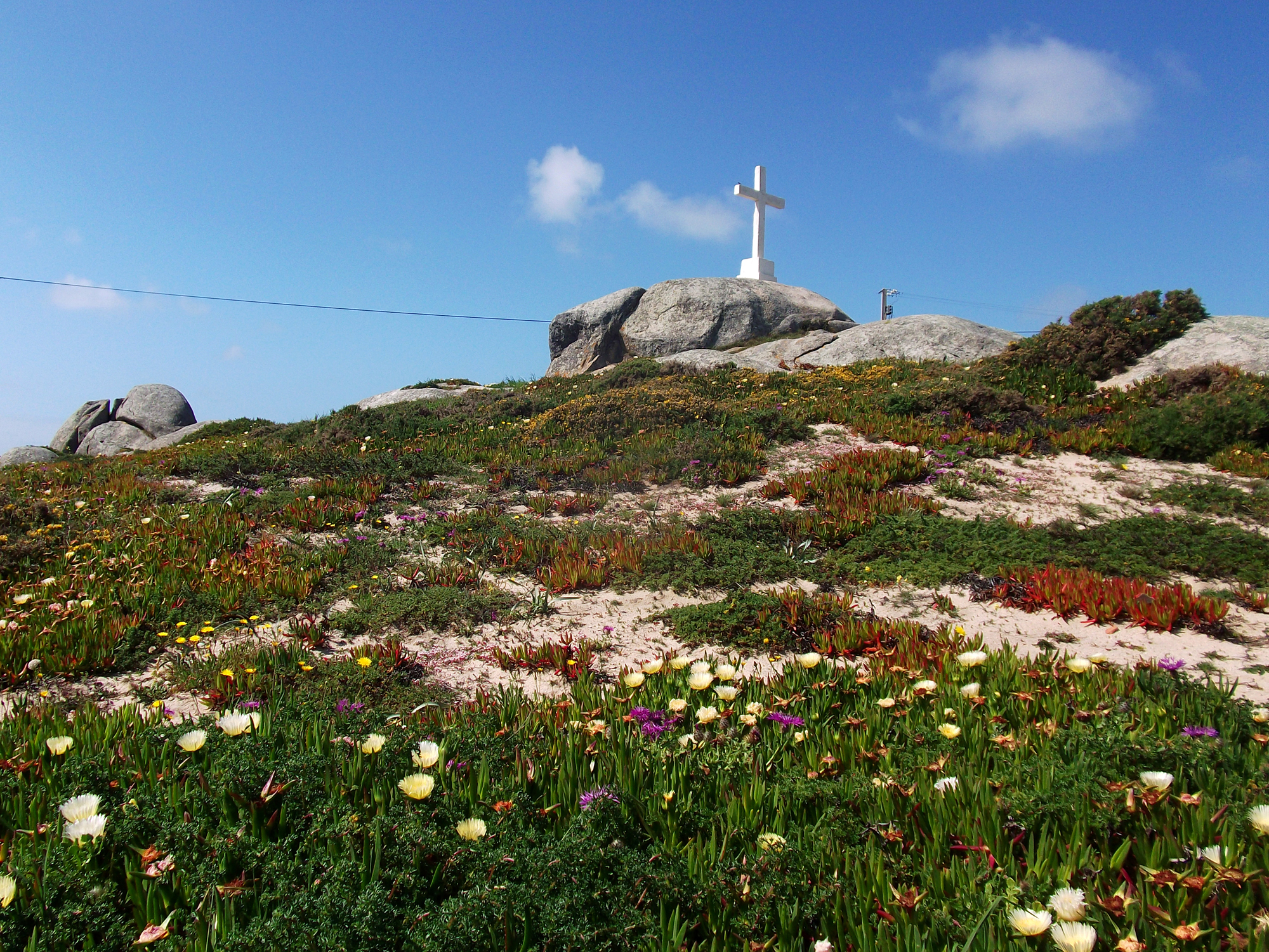
Saint Andrew's Rock (Penedo do Santo)
