= Fragosa Beach =

Beach in Póvoa de Varzim, Portugal

Coordinates: 41.3976°N 8.7811°W

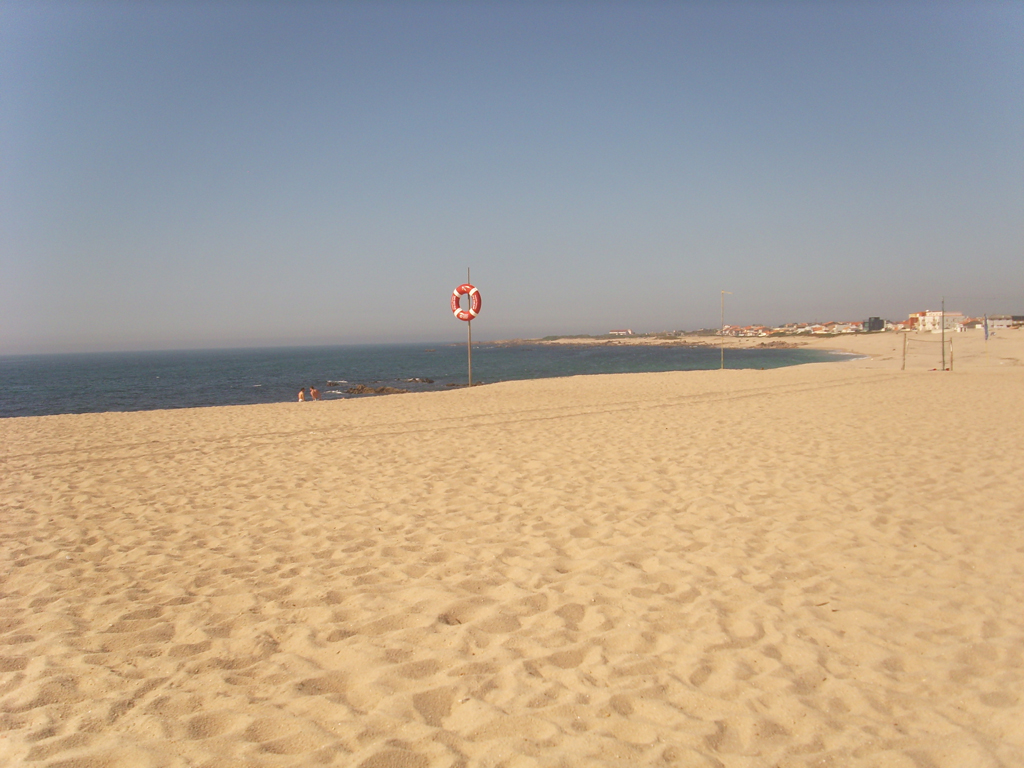
Fragosa Beach in Aver-o-Mar Cove.

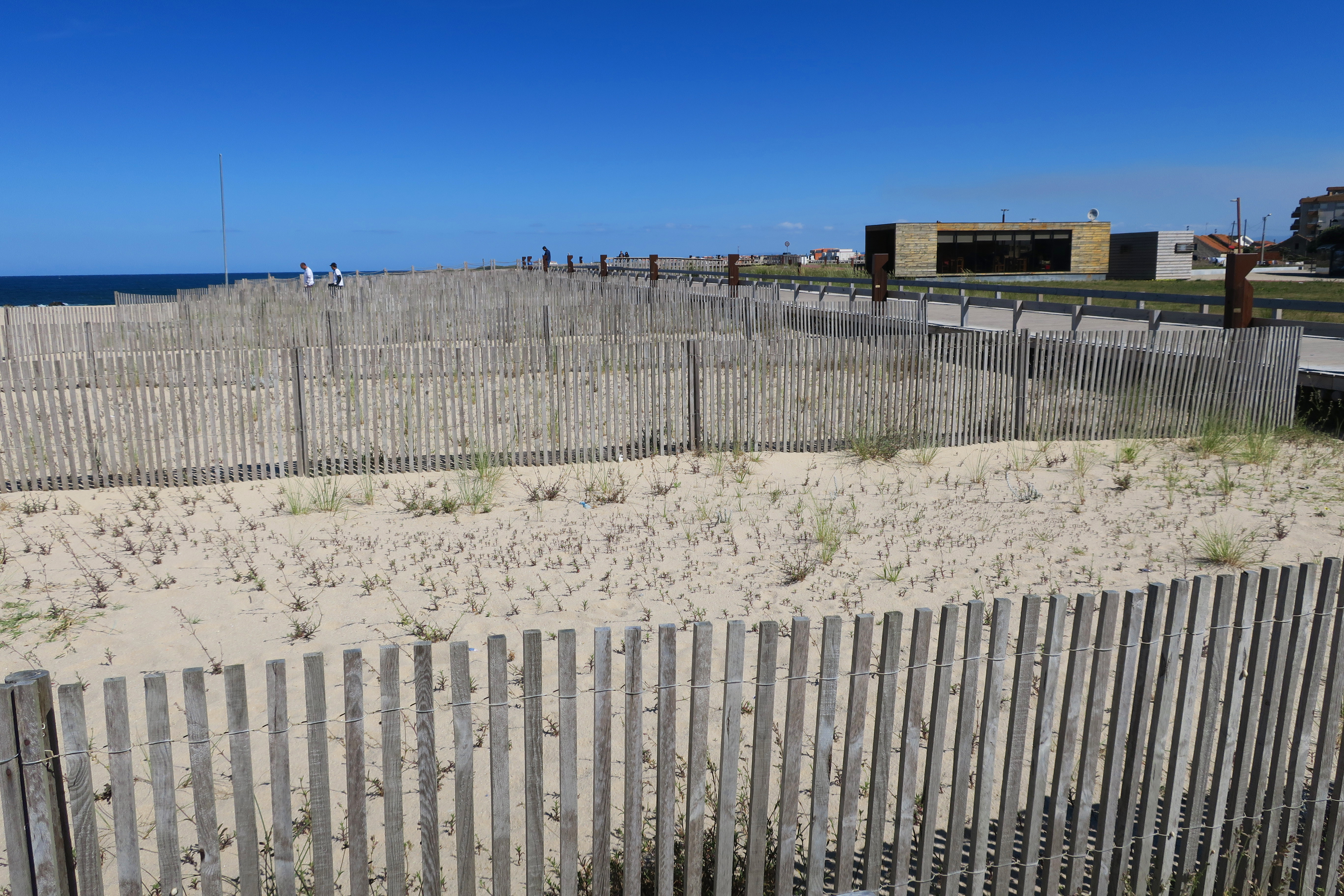
Recovery of sand dune grassland in Fragosa Beach.

Fragosa Beach (Praia da Fragosa in Portuguese) is an extensive maritime beach of Póvoa de Varzim, Portugal. It is located in the parish of A Ver-o-Mar. The beach is popular in the summer, but very calm during winter. The beach has white sand and no or very few rocks.

In front of the beach there's Forcado Islet, small and rocky, the islet has the shape of a camel's double hump.
