= Quião Beach, Portugal =

Maritime beach

Coordinates: 41.4°N 8.8°W

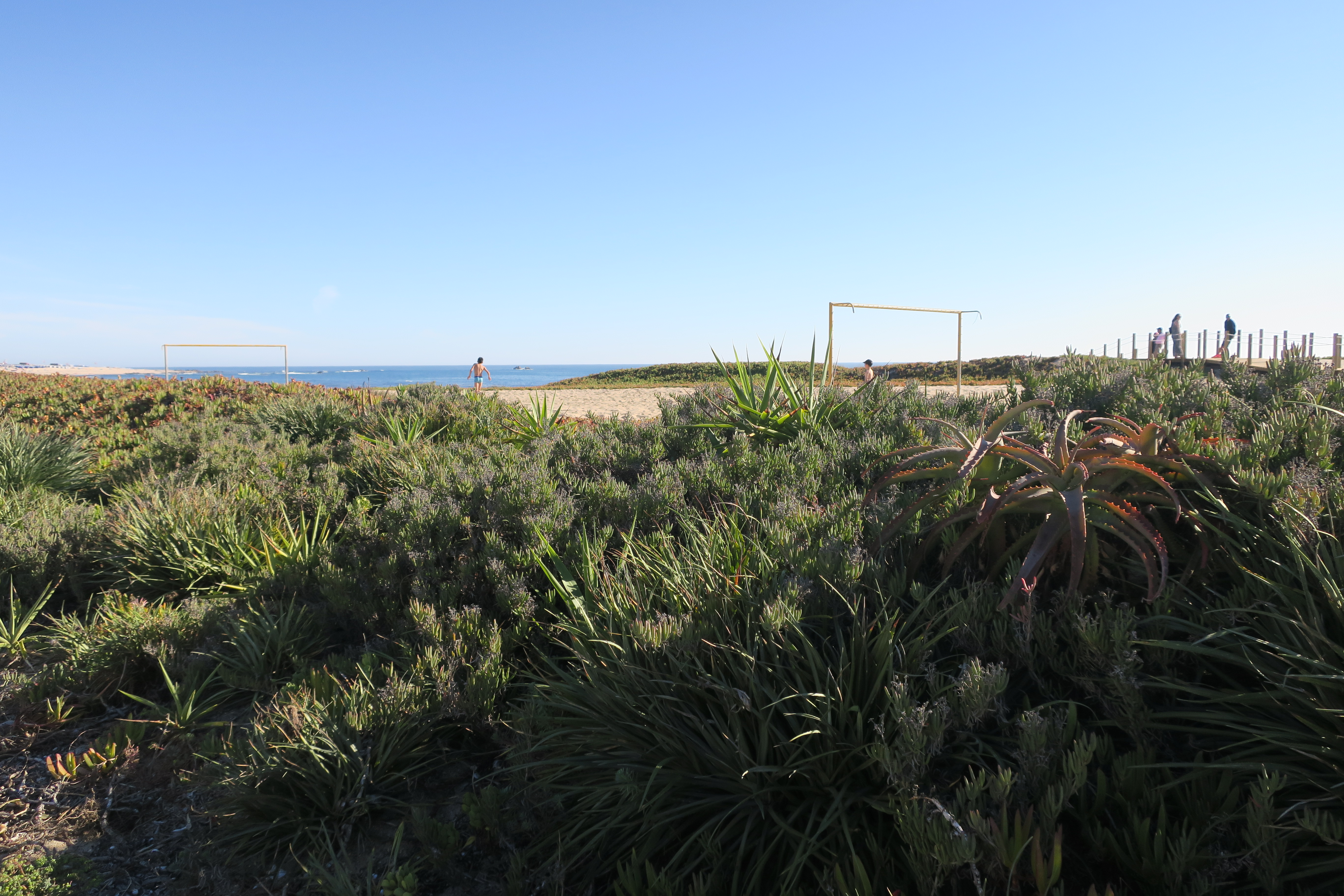
southern section of Quião Beach is increasingly popular and family-friendly.

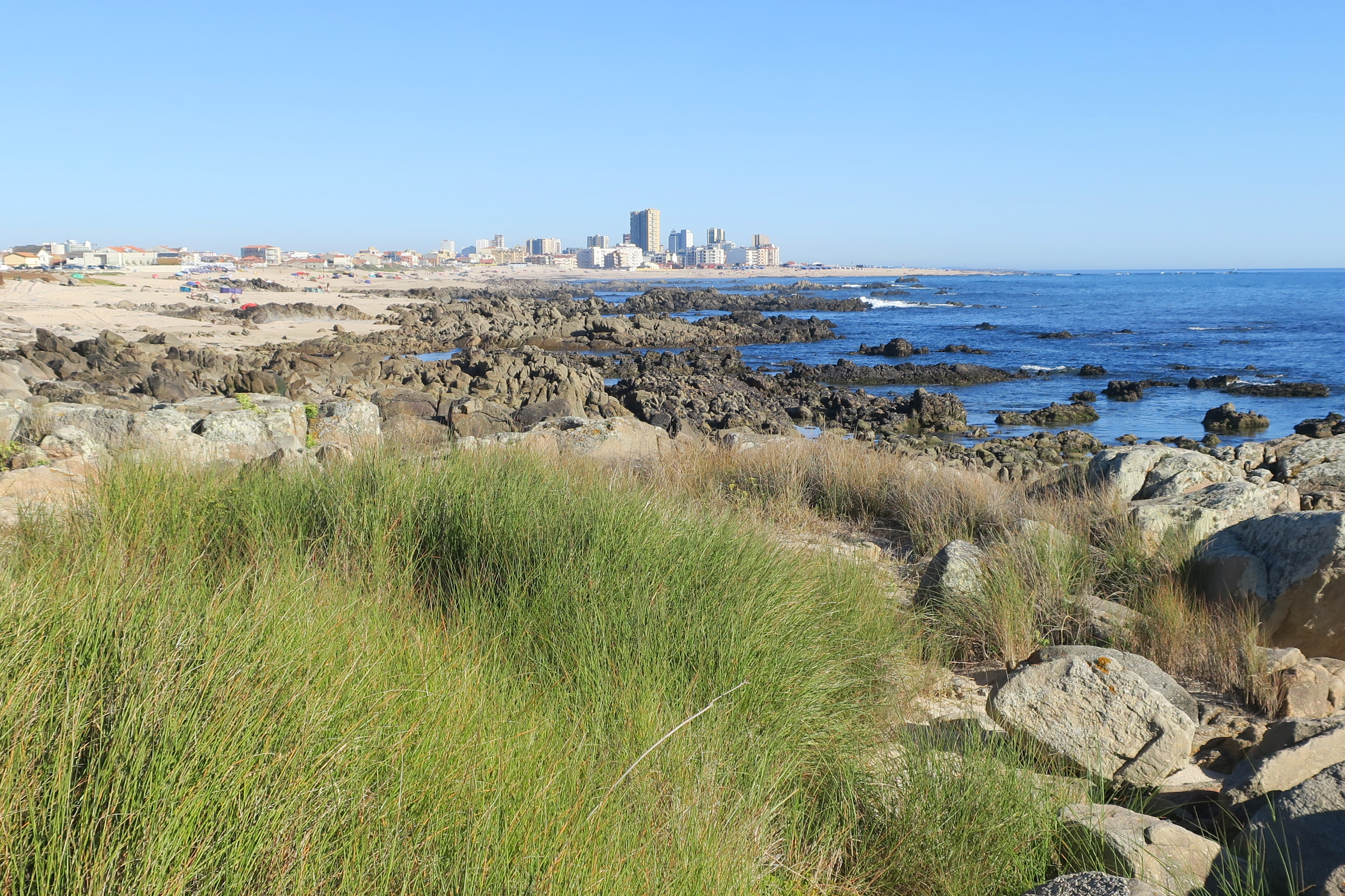
Northern section of Quião Beach as seen from the cape. The beach is dominated by gneiss outcrops, which shelters a significant diversity of marine life.

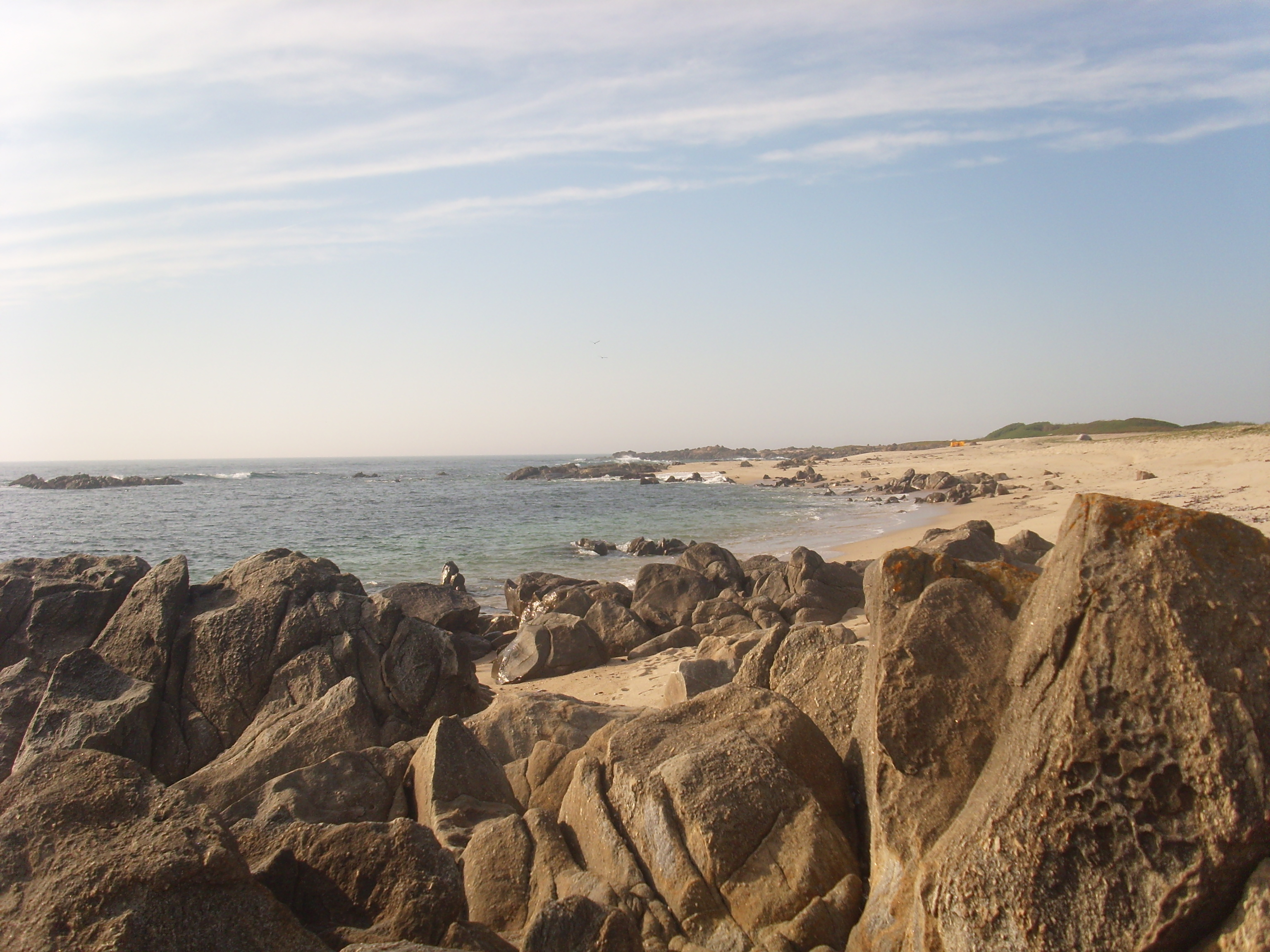
Quião Beach is dominated by rocky outcrops.

Quião Beach (Praia do Quião in Portuguese) is an extensive maritime beach of Póvoa de Varzim, Portugal, located just South of Cape Santo André in the area of A Ver-o-Mar. It has fine to medium sand and several rocky outcrops. The beach is a coastal dune habitat and a rich and diverse marine ecosystem, including large honeycomb reefs. It has a popular beach restaurant, Praia do Mestre.

In northern section of Quião beach, where the waterfront street ends, the traditional Sargassum seaweed gathering is still practiced; it is spread and laid in the beach for sun drying, leaving a pleasant sargassum breeze in the beach, before being pilled to make "medas". This area is protected by dunes, the gneiss. Given its quietude, can be occasionally used naturists, and as a flirting area. It is increasingly popular by other groups of people. In 2016, a boardwalk was built crossing all Cape Santo André, allowing an easy cross of Northern Quião, it is used by the Portuguese Coastal Way of Saint James.
