= Viking expansion =

8th–11th century expansion by Norsemen

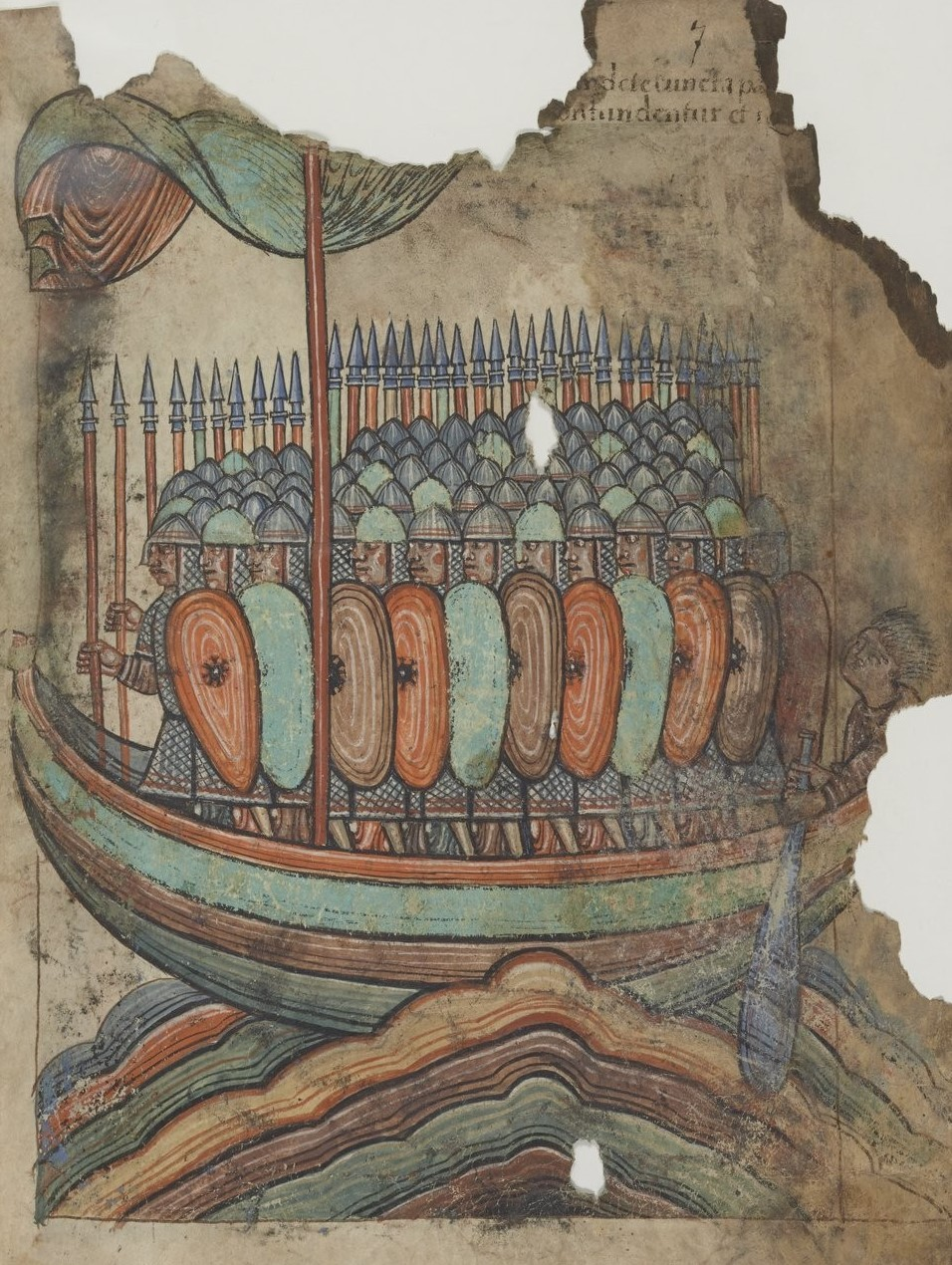
Depiction of Vikings sailing a longship from c. 1100

Viking expansion was the historical movement, beginning in the 8th century, which led Vikings to sail most of the North Atlantic, reaching south as far as North Africa and east as far as Russia, and through the Mediterranean as far as Constantinople and the Middle East, acting as looters, traders, colonists and mercenaries. To the west, Vikings under Leif Erikson (the heir to Erik the Red) reached North America and set up a short-lived settlement in present-day L'Anse aux Meadows, Newfoundland, Canada. Longer lasting and more established Norse settlements were formed in Greenland, Iceland, the Faroe Islands, Russia, Ukraine, Britain, Ireland, Normandy and Sicily.

By the 11th century expansion largely ceased, but many areas were left with populations of Viking descent, integrated into other local populations in various ways. Some Viking descendents formed ruling dynasties or elites, while elsewhere they settled down as farmers.

== Motivation for expansion ==
There is much debate among historians about what drove the Viking expansion. Researchers have suggested that Vikings may have originally begun seeking out women from foreign lands. The concept was expressed in the 11th century by historian Dudo of Saint-Quentin in his semi-imaginary History of The Normans. Rich and powerful Viking men tended to have many wives and concubines, and these polygynous relationships may have led to a shortage of eligible women for the average Viking male. Thus the average Viking man could have been forced to perform riskier actions to gain wealth and power to be able to find suitable women. Viking men would often buy or capture women and make them into their wives or concubines. Polygynous marriage increases male-male competition in society because it creates a pool of unmarried men who are willing to engage in risky status-elevating and sex-seeking behaviors. The Annals of Ulster states that in 821 the Vikings plundered an Irish village and "carried off a great number of women into captivity".

Raiding parties offered not only the opportunity for violence and wealth, but also the chance to be noticed by their peers and superiors. They offered the opportunity to build a reputation for skill, reliability, cunning, or courage. Just as raiding leaders had more to gain than just material wealth, their followers could also gain intangible social capital by participating.

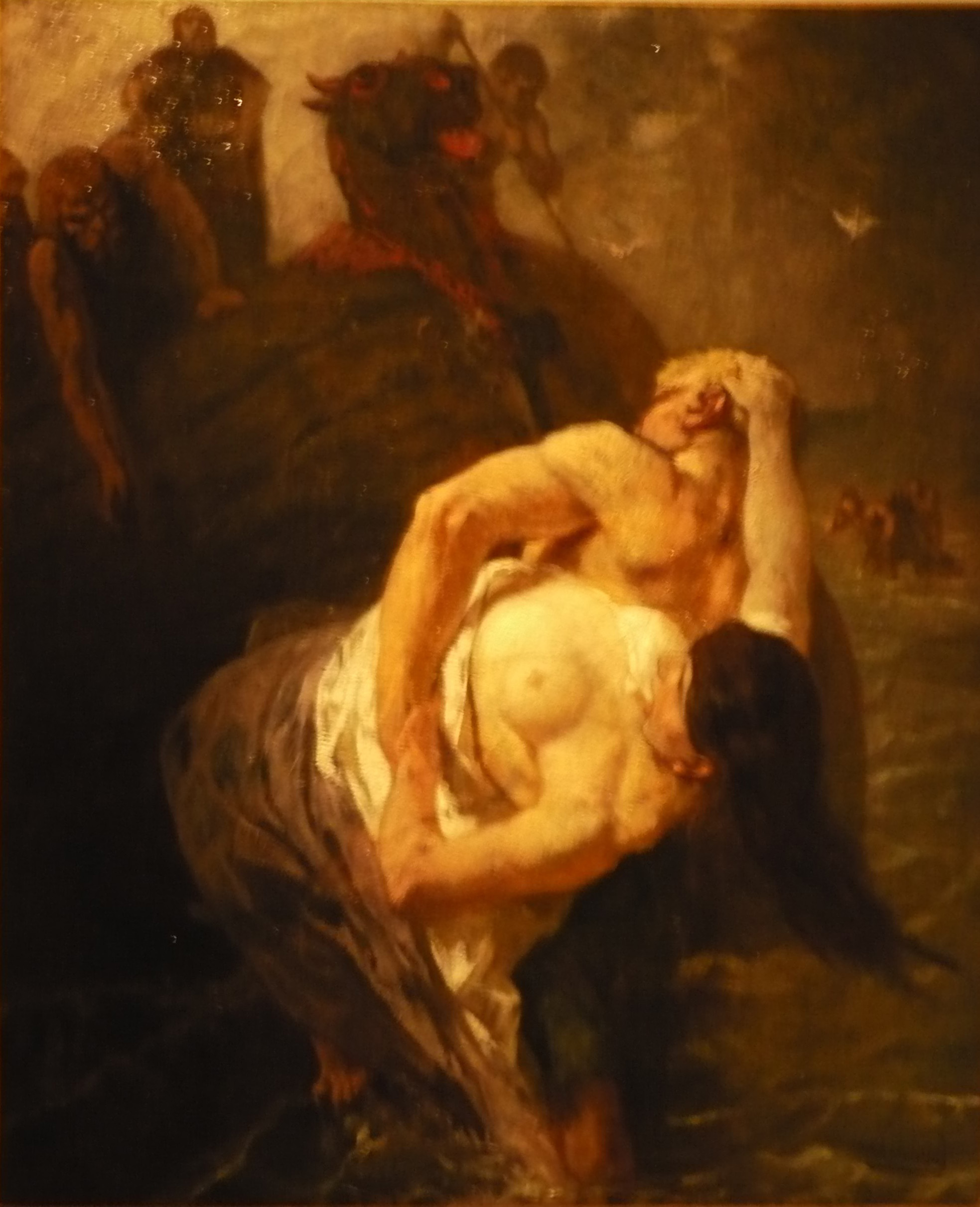
A depiction of Vikings kidnapping a woman. Viking men often kidnapped foreign women for marriage or concubinage from lands that they had pillaged. Illustrated by French painter Évariste Vital Luminais in the 19th century.

Another theory is that it was a quest for revenge against continental Europeans for past aggressions against the Vikings and related groups, such as Charlemagne's Saxon Wars in which he forced pagans to convert to Christianity by killing any who refused to become baptized. Those who favor this explanation point out that the penetration of Christianity into Scandinavia caused serious conflict and divided Norway for almost a century. However, the first target of Viking raids was not the Frankish Kingdom but Christian monasteries in England. According to historian Peter Sawyer, these were raided because they were centers of wealth and their farms well-stocked, not because of any religious reasons.

A different idea is that the Viking population had exceeded the agricultural potential of their homeland. This may have been true of western Norway, where there were few reserves of land; however, it is unlikely that the rest of Scandinavia was experiencing famine. Some scholars propose that the Viking expansion was driven by a youth bulge effect: Because the eldest son of a family customarily inherited the family's entire estate, younger sons had to seek their fortune by emigrating or engaging in raids. Peter Sawyer suggests that most Vikings emigrated due to the attractiveness of owning more land rather than the necessity of having it. However, no rise in population, youth bulge, or decline in agricultural production during this period has been definitively demonstrated. Nor is it clear why such pressures would have prompted expansion overseas rather than into the vast, uncultivated forest areas in the interior of the Scandinavian Peninsula, although perhaps emigration or sea raids may have been easier or more profitable than clearing large areas of forest for farm and pasture in a region with a limited growing season.

A decline in the profitability of old trade routes may have driven the Vikings to seek out new, more profitable ones. Trade between western Europe and the rest of Eurasia may have suffered after the Roman Empire lost its western provinces in the 5th century, and the expansion of Islam in the 7th century may have reduced trade opportunities within western Europe by redirecting resources along the Silk Road. Trade in the Mediterranean was at its lowest level in history when the Vikings began their expansion. The Viking expansion opened new trade routes in Arab and Frankish lands, and they took control of trade markets previously dominated by the Frisians after the Franks destroyed the Frisian fleet. One of the main aims of the Viking expansion throughout Europe was to acquire and trade silver. Bergen and Dublin are still important centres of silversmithing. An example of a collection of Viking-age silver for trading purposes is the Galloway Hoard.

Pagans from Eastern Europe came to be the most popular targets for slavery in both the Byzantine Empire and the Islamic Arab world during the Early Middle Ages, where they were forced to convert to Christianity and Islam respectively after their enslavement. The Vikings trafficked European slaves captured in Viking raids in Eastern Europe in two destinations from present day Russia via the Volga trade route; one to slavery in the Abbasid Caliphate in the Middle East via the Caspian Sea, the Samanid slave trade and Iran; and one to the Byzantine Empire and the Mediterranean via Dnieper and the Black Sea slave trade. During the 8th to 10th centuries, slaves from Eastern Europe and the Baltic Sea were traded to elite households in Byzantium and the Islamic world via the Dnieper and Volga river systems, the Carolingian Empire and Venice. The slaves may have also been transported to Hedeby or Brännö and then transported through the Volga trade route to Russia, where slaves and furs were sold to Muslim merchants in exchange for Arab silver dirham and silk, which have been found in Birka, Wollin and Dublin; initially this trade route between Europe and the Abbasid Caliphate passed via the Khazar Khaganate, but from the early 10th-century onward it went via Volga Bulgaria and from there by caravan to Khwarazm, to the Samanid slave market in Central Asia and finally via Iran to the Abbasid Caliphate.

One of the reasons Kievan Rus' came to be was that Scandinavian settlers established themselves and traded with captured slaves. Arabic merchants from the Caspian Sea and Byzantine merchants from the Black Sea brought their goods to the trade markets in Rus', where they met the Viking traders and warriors known as Varangians, and they traded their goods for the slaves captured by the Vikings in Eastern Europe. The Viking slave trade was the source of the Arab dirham silver hoards found in Scandinavia and functioned from at least 786 until 1009, when such coins have been found there. The silver would have been so lucrative that it contributed to the continuing Viking raids, which was used by the Vikings as a slave supply source for this trade with the Islamic world. Such hoards include the Spillings Hoard and the Sundveda Hoard.

=== Settlement demographics ===
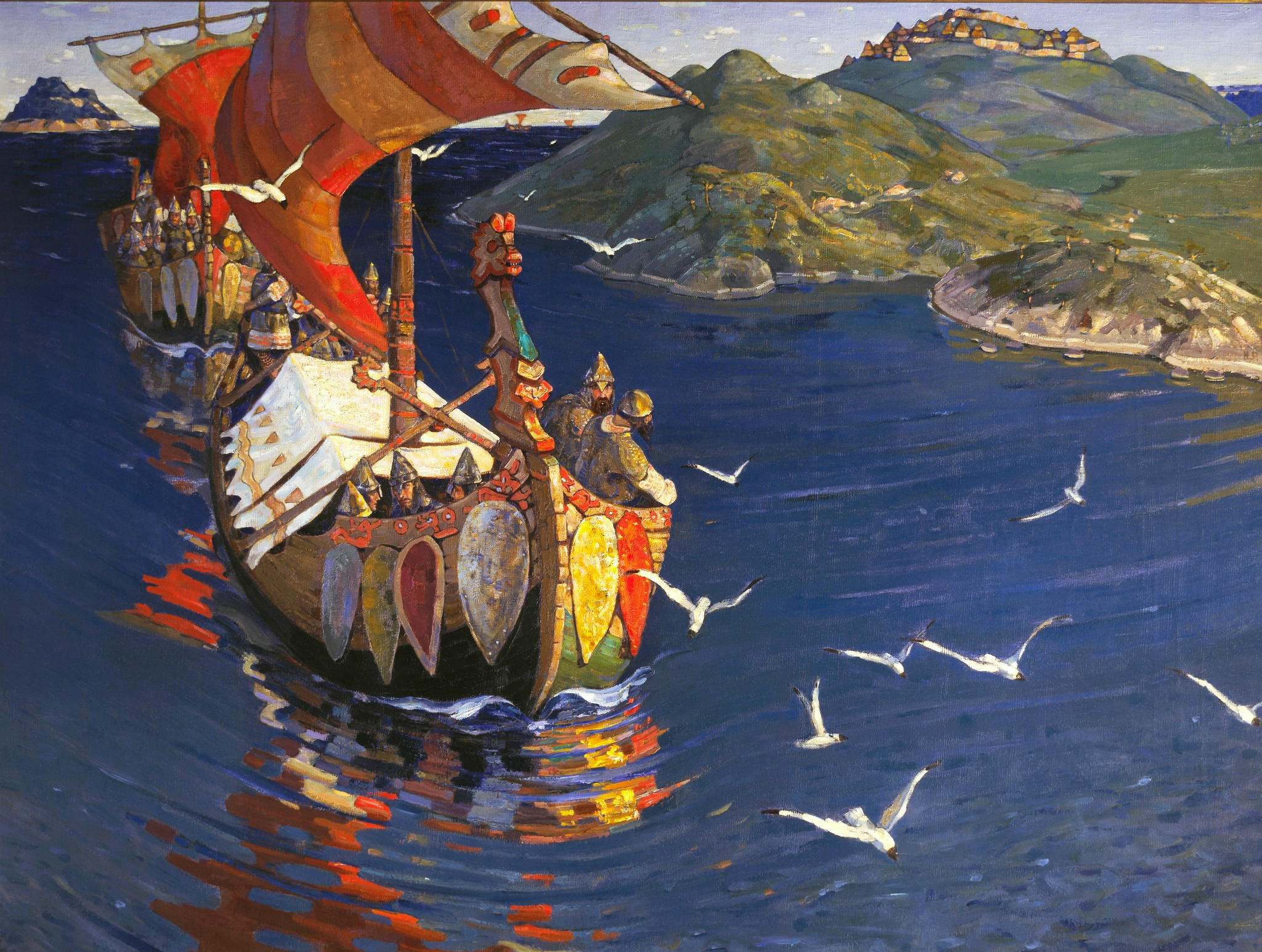
Guests from Overseas (1901) by Nicholas Roerich, depicting a Viking raid. (Varangians in Rus')

Viking settlements in Ireland and Great Britain are thought to have been primarily male enterprises; however, some graves show nearly equal male/female distribution. Disagreement is partly due to method of classification; previous archaeology often guessed biological sex from burial artifacts, whereas modern archaeology may use osteology to find biological sex, and isotope analysis to find origin (DNA sampling is usually not possible). The males buried during that period in a cemetery on the Isle of Man had mainly names of Norse origin, while the females there had names of indigenous origin. Irish and British women are mentioned in old texts on the founding of Iceland, indicating that the Viking explorers were accompanied there by women from the British Isles who either came along voluntarily or were taken along by force. Genetic studies of the population in the Western Isles and Isle of Skye also show that Viking settlements were established mainly by male Vikings who mated with women from the local populations of those places.

However, not all Viking settlements were primarily male. Genetic studies of the Shetland population suggest that family units consisting of Viking women as well as men were the norm among the migrants to these areas. This may be because areas like the Shetland Islands, being closer to Scandinavia, were more suitable targets for family migrations, while frontier settlements further north and west were more suitable for groups of unattached male colonizers.

== British Isles ==
=== England ===
Map of England in 878, depicting the Danelaw territory

King Canute's territories 1014–1035. (Note that the Norwegian (now Swedish) lands of Jemtland, Herjedalen, Idre and Særna are not included in this map).

During the reign of King Beorhtric of Wessex (786–802), three ships of "Northmen" landed at Portland Bay in Dorset. The local reeve mistook the Vikings for merchants and directed them to the nearby royal estate, but the Vikings killed him and his men. On 8 June 793, "the ravages of heathen men miserably desecrated God's church on Lindisfarne, with plunder and slaughter". According to the 12th-century Anglo-Norman chronicler Symeon of Durham, the raiders killed the resident monks or threw them into the sea to drown or carried them away as slaves – along with some of the church treasures. In 875, after enduring eight decades of repeated Viking raids, the monks fled Lindisfarne, carrying the relics of Saint Cuthbert with them.

In 794, according to the Anglo-Saxon Chronicle, a small Viking fleet attacked a rich monastery at Jarrow. The Vikings met with stronger resistance than they had expected, and their leaders were killed. The raiders escaped, only to have their ships beached at Tynemouth and the crews killed by locals. This represented one of the last raids on England for about 40 years. The Vikings focused instead on Ireland and Scotland.

In 865, a group of hitherto uncoordinated bands of predominantly Danish Vikings joined to form a large army and landed in East Anglia. The Anglo-Saxon Chronicle describes this force as the mycel hæþen here (Great Heathen Army) and states that it was led by Ivar the Boneless and Halfdan Ragnarsson. The army crossed the Midlands into Northumbria and captured York (Jorvik). In 871, the Great Heathen Army was reinforced by another Danish force known as the Great Summer Army led by Guthrum. In 875, the Great Heathen Army split into two bands, with Guthrum leading one back to Wessex, and Halfdan taking his followers north. Then in 876, Halfdan shared out Northumbrian land south of the River Tees amongst his men, who "ploughed the land and supported themselves", founding the territory later known as the Danelaw. (Note: Not all the Norse arriving in Ireland and Great Britain came as raiders. Many arrived with families and livestock, often in the wake of the capture of territory by their forces. The populations then merged over time by intermarriage into the Anglo-Saxon population of these areas. Many words in the English language come from old Scandinavian languages.)

Most of the English kingdoms, being in turmoil, could not stand against the Vikings, but King Alfred of Wessex defeated Guthrum's army at the Battle of Edington in 878, resulting in the Treaty of Wedmore and then the Treaty of Alfred and Guthrum in 886. These treaties formalised the boundaries of the English kingdoms and the Viking Danelaw territory, with provisions for peaceful relations between the English and the Vikings. Despite these treaties, conflict continued on and off. However, Alfred and his successors eventually drove back the Viking frontier and retook York.

A wave of Vikings appeared in 947, when Erik Bloodaxe captured York. The Viking presence continued through the reign of the Danish prince Cnut the Great (reigned as King of England: 1016–1035), after which a series of inheritance arguments weakened the hold on power of Cnut's heirs. When King Edward the Confessor died in 1066, Harald Hardrada of Norway challenged his successor as King of England, Harold Godwinson. Hardrada was killed, and his Norwegian army was defeated by Harold Godwinson on 25 September 1066 at the Battle of Stamford Bridge. Godwinson died when William the Conqueror defeated the English army at the Battle of Hastings in October 1066. William was crowned king of England on 25 December 1066; however, it was several years before he was able to bring the kingdom under his complete control. In 1070, Danish King Sweyn Estridsson sailed up the Humber with an army in support of Edgar Ætheling, the last surviving male member of the English royal family. However, after capturing York, Sweyn accepted a payment from William to desert Edgar. Five years later one of Sweyn's sons set sail for England to support another English rebellion, but it had been crushed before the expedition arrived, so they settled for plundering the city of York and the surrounding area before returning home.

In 1085, Sweyn's son Canute IV of Denmark planned a major invasion of England, but the assembled fleet never sailed. No further serious Danish invasions of England occurred after this. Some raiding occurred during King Stephen's reign, when King Eystein II of Norway took advantage of the civil war to plunder the east coast of England, where they sacked Hartlepool, County Durham and Whitby, Yorkshire in 1152. These raids marked the conclusion of the Viking Age in England.

=== Scotland ===
Map of the Kingdom of the Isles and Earldom of Orkney

The monastery at Iona on the west coast was first raided in 794 and was abandoned for 50 years due to several devastating attacks. While there are few records from the earliest period, it is believed that Scandinavian presence in Scotland increased in the 830s.

The isles to the north and west of Scotland were heavily colonised by Vikings. Shetland, Orkney and the Hebrides came under Norse control, sometimes as fiefs under the King of Norway and at other times as separate entities under variously the Kings of the Isles, the Earldom of Orkney and the later Kings of Mann and the Isles. Shetland and Orkney were the last of these to be incorporated into Scotland in 1468.

=== Wales ===
Viking colonies were not a feature of Wales as much as the other nations of the British Isles. This has traditionally been attributed to the powerful unified forces of the contemporary Welsh kings, particularly Rhodri the Great. Thus, the Vikings were unable to establish any states or areas of control in Wales and were largely limited to raids and trading.

The Danish are recorded raiding Anglesey in 854. Welsh records state that two years later, Rhodri won an important victory, killing the Danish King Gorm. Two further victories by Rhodri are recorded in the Brut y Tywysogion for 872. The first battle was at a place named as Bangolau or Bann Guolou or Bannoleu, where the Vikings in Anglesey were again defeated "in a hard battle". In the second battle at Manegid or Enegyd, the records state that the remaining Vikings "were destroyed". The Anglo-Saxon Chronicle records Viking armies being pursued by a combined force of West Saxons and north Welsh along the River Severn. This combined army eventually overtook the Vikings before defeating them at the Battle of Buttington.

The early Normans in Wales shared the maritime history of the Vikings, tracing their lineage back to the same wave of raiders and settlers that harried the Welsh coast in the 9th century. As such, it was often the Viking names that were favoured by the Cambro-Normans and passed into Middle English. This impact can be seen today, where many coastal names in Wales have an English name derived from the Vikings and unrelated to the original Welsh name. The modern English name Anglesey (Welsh: Ynys Môn) is of Scandinavian origin, as are a number of the island's most prominent coastal features. The English names for Caldey Island (Welsh: Ynys Bŷr), Flat Holm (Welsh: Ynys Echni) and Grassholm (Welsh: Ynys Gwales) are also those of the Viking raiders. Wales' second largest city, Swansea (Welsh: Abertawe) is often said to have taken its English name from a Viking trading post founded by Sweyn Forkbeard, the original name, Old Norse: Sveinsey translating as Sweyn's island or Sweyn's inlet. Worm's Head (Welsh: Ynys Weryn) is derived from Old Norse: wurme, the word for serpent or dragon, from the Vikings' tradition that the serpent-shaped island was a sleeping dragon.

=== Cornwall ===
The Anglo-Saxon Chronicle reports that "heathen men" (the Danes) raided Charmouth, Dorset in 833, then in 997 destroyed the Dartmoor town of Lydford, and from 1001 to 1003 occupied the old Roman city of Exeter. The Cornish were subjugated by King Æthelstan of England in 936 and the border finally set at the River Tamar. The Cornish remained semi-autonomous until their annexation into England after the Norman Conquest.

=== Ireland ===
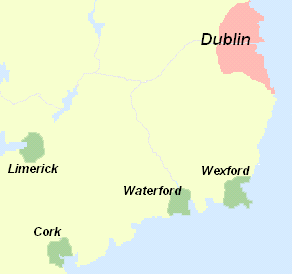
Areas of Norse influence in 10th century Ireland

In 795 small bands of Vikings began plundering monastic settlements along the coast of Gaelic Ireland. The Annals of Ulster state that in 821 the Vikings plundered Howth and "carried off a great number of women into captivity". From 840 the Vikings began building fortified encampments, longphorts, on the coast and overwintering in Ireland. The first were at Dublin and Linn Duachaill. Their attacks became bigger and reached further inland, striking larger monastic settlements such as Armagh, Clonmacnoise, Glendalough, Kells and Kildare, and also plundering the ancient tombs of Brú na Bóinne. Viking chief Thorgest is said to have raided the whole midlands of Ireland until he was killed by Máel Sechnaill I in 845.

In 853 Viking leader Amlaíb (Olaf) became the first king of Dublin. He ruled along with his brothers Ímar (possibly Ivar the Boneless) and Auisle. Over the following decades, there was regular warfare between the Vikings and the Irish, and between two groups of Vikings: the Dubgaill and Finngaill (dark and fair foreigners). The Vikings also briefly allied with various Irish kings against their rivals. In 866, Áed Findliath burnt all Viking longphorts in the north, and they never managed to establish permanent settlements in that region. The Vikings were driven from Dublin in 902.

They returned in 914, led by the Uí Ímair (House of Ivar). During the next eight years, the Vikings won decisive battles against the Irish, regained control of Dublin, and founded settlements at Waterford, Wexford, Cork and Limerick, which became Ireland's first large towns. They were important trading hubs, and the slave trade in Viking Dublin was the largest slave port in western Europe, from which they were sold to Moorish Spain.

These Viking territories became part of the patchwork of kingdoms in Ireland. Vikings intermarried with the Irish and adopted elements of Irish culture, becoming the Norse-Gaels. Some Viking kings of Dublin also ruled the kingdom of the Isles and York. Sitric Silkbeard was "a patron of the arts, a benefactor of the church, and an economic innovator" who established Ireland's first mint in Dublin.

In 980, Máel Sechnaill Mór defeated the Dublin Vikings and forced them into submission at the Battle of Tara. Over the following 30 years, Brian Boru subdued the Viking territories and made himself High King of Ireland. The Dublin Vikings, together with Leinster, twice rebelled against him, but they were defeated in the battles of Glenmama (999) and Clontarf (1014). After the battle of Clontarf, the Dublin Vikings could no longer "single-handedly threaten the power of the most powerful kings of Ireland". Brian's rise to power and conflict with the Vikings is chronicled in Cogad Gáedel re Gallaib ("The War of the Irish with the Foreigners").

== European mainland ==
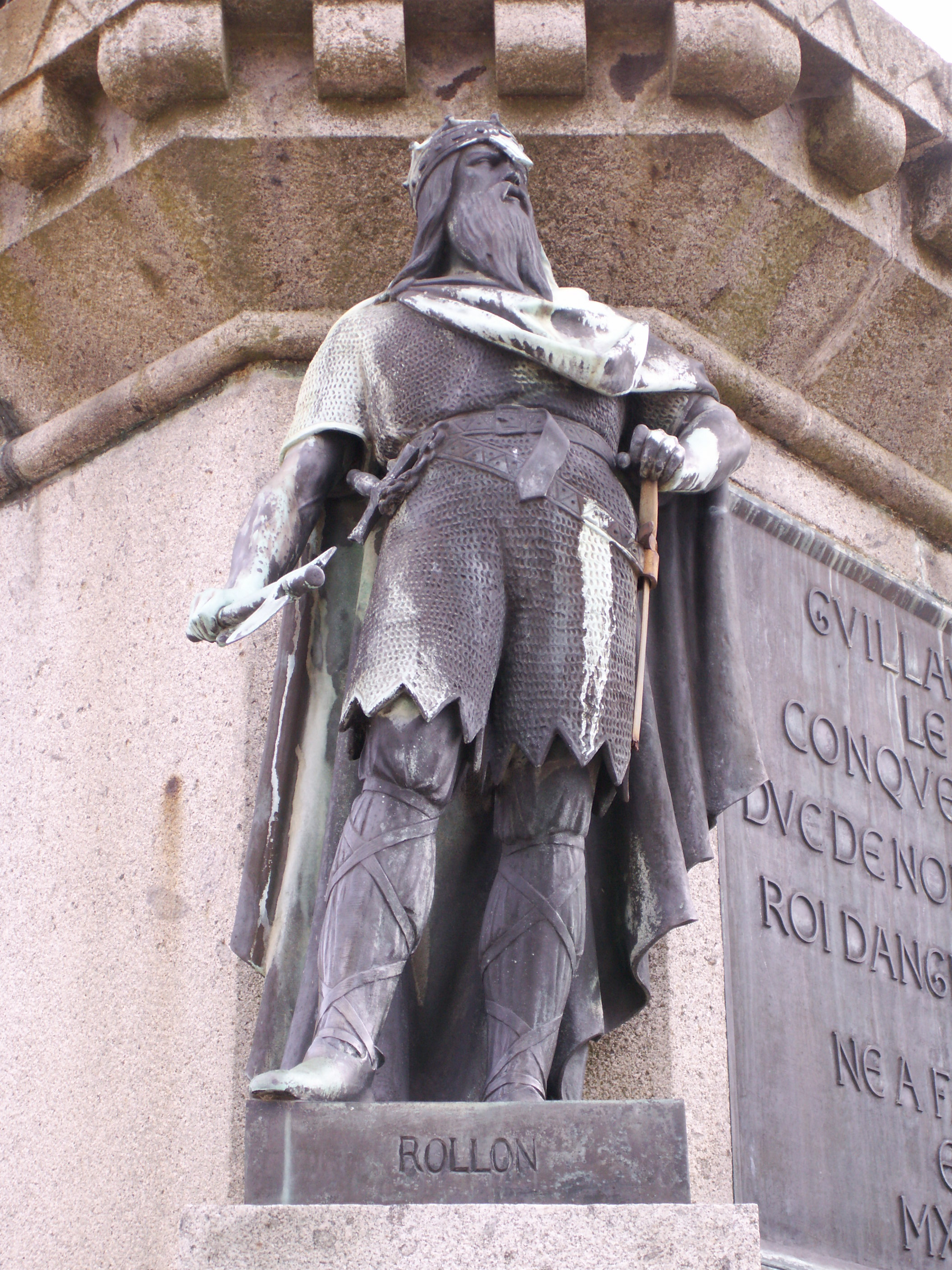
Statue of Rollo, Duke of Normandy

=== Normandy ===
The name of Normandy denotes its Viking origin, from "Northmannia" or Land of The Norsemen. The Viking presence in Normandy began with raids into the territory of the Frankish Empire from the middle of the 9th century. Viking raids extended deep into the Frankish territory and included the sacking of many prominent towns such as Rouen, Paris and the abbey at Jumièges. The inability of King Charles the Bald and later Charles the Simple to prevent these Viking incursions forced them to offer vast payments of silver and gold to prevent any further pillage. These pay-offs were short lived, and the Danish raiders would always return for more.

The Duchy of Normandy was created for the Viking leader Rollo after he had besieged Paris. In 911 Rollo entered vassalage to Charles the Simple through the Treaty of Saint-Clair-sur-Epte. This treaty made of Rollo the first Norman Count of Rouen. In addition, Rollo was baptized and married Gisele, the daughter of Charles. In exchange for his homage and fealty, Rollo legally gained the territory which he and his Viking allies had previously conquered.

The descendants of Rollo and his followers adopted the local Gallo-Romance languages and intermarried with the area's original inhabitants. They became the Normans – a Norman French-speaking mixture of Scandinavians and indigenous Franks and Gauls. The language of Normandy heavily reflected the Danish influence, as many words (especially ones pertaining to seafaring) were borrowed from Old Norse or Old Danish. More than the language itself, the Norman toponymy retains a strong Nordic influence. Nevertheless, only a few archaeological traces have been found: swords dredged out of the Seine between its estuary and Rouen; the tomb of a female Viking at Pîtres; the two Thor's hammers at Saint-Pierre-de-Varengeville and Sahurs; and more recently the hoard of Viking coins at Saint-Pierre-des-Fleurs.

Rollo's descendant William the Conqueror became King of England after the Battle of Hastings in October 1066. As king of England, he retained the fiefdom of Normandy for himself and his descendants. The kings of England made claim to Normandy, as well as their other possessions in France, which led to various disputes with the French. This culminated in the French confiscation of Gascony that precipitated the Hundred Years' War in 1337.

=== West Francia and Middle Francia ===
West Francia and Middle Francia suffered more severely than East Francia during the Viking raids of the 9th century. The reign of Charles the Bald coincided with some of the worst of these raids, though he did take action by the Edict of Pistres of 864 to secure a standing army of cavalry under royal control to be called upon at all times when necessary to fend off the invaders. He also ordered the building of fortified bridges to prevent inland raids.

Nonetheless, the Bretons allied with the Vikings and Robert, the margrave of Neustria, (a march created for defence against the Vikings sailing up the Loire), and Ranulf of Aquitaine died in the 865 Battle of Brissarthe. The Vikings also took advantage of the civil wars which ravaged the Duchy of Aquitaine in the early years of Charles' reign. In the 840s Pepin II called in the Vikings to aid him against Charles, and they settled at the mouth of the Garonne as they did by the Loire. Two dukes of Gascony, Seguin II and William I, died defending Bordeaux from Viking assaults. A later duke, Sancho Mitarra, even settled some at the mouth of the Adour near Bayonne in an act presaging that of Charles the Simple and the Treaty of Saint-Clair-sur-Epte by which the Vikings were settled in Rouen, creating Normandy as a bulwark against other Vikings.

In the 9th and 10th centuries, the Vikings raided the largely defenceless Frisian and Frankish towns lying on the coast and along the rivers of the Low Countries. Although Vikings never settled in large numbers in those areas, they did set up long-term bases and were even acknowledged as lords in a few cases. They set up bases in Saint-Florent-le-Vieil at the mouth of the Loire, in Taillebourg, around Bayonne on the banks of the Adour, in Noirmoutier and on the River Seine (Rouen) in what would become Normandy.

Antwerp was raided in 836. Later there were raids of Ghent, Kortrijk, Tournai, Leuven and the areas around the Meuse river, the Rhine, the Rupel river and the tributaries of those rivers. Raids were conducted from bases established in Asselt, Walcheren, Wieringen and Elterberg (or Eltenberg, a small hill near Elten). In Dutch and Frisian historical tradition, the trading centre of Dorestad declined after Viking raids from 834 to 863; however, since no convincing Viking archaeological evidence has been found at the site, doubts about this have grown in recent years.

One of the more important Viking families in the Low Countries was that of Rorik of Dorestad (based in Wieringen) and his brother Harald (based in Walcheren). Around 850, Lothair I acknowledged Rorik as ruler of most of Friesland. In 870 Rorik was received by Charles the Bald in Nijmegen, to whom he became a vassal. Viking raids continued during this period. Harald's son Rodulf and his men were killed by the people of Oostergo in 873. Rorik died sometime before 882.

Buried Viking treasures consisting mainly of silver have been found in the Low Countries. Two such treasures have been found in Wieringen. A large treasure found in Wieringen in 1996 dates from around 850 and is thought to have been connected to Rorik. The burial of such a valuable treasure is seen as an indication that there was a permanent settlement in Wieringen.

Around 879 Godfrid arrived in Frisian lands as the head of a large force that terrorised the Low Countries. Using Ghent as his base, they ravaged Ghent, Maastricht, Liège, Stavelot, Prüm, Cologne, and Koblenz. Controlling most of Frisia between 882 and 885, Godfrid became known to history as Godfrid, Duke of Frisia. His lordship over Frisia was acknowledged by Charles the Fat, to whom he became a vassal. In the siege of Asselt in 882, the Franks sieged a Viking camp at Asselt in Frisia. Although the Vikings were not forced by arms to abandon their camp, they were compelled to come to terms in which Godfrid was converted to Christianity. Godfrid was assassinated in 885, after which Gerolf of Holland assumed lordship and Viking rule of Frisia came to an end. Viking raids of the Low Countries continued for over a century. Remains of Viking attacks dating from 880 to 890 have been found in Zutphen and Deventer. The last attacks took place in Tiel in 1006 and Utrecht in 1007.

=== Iberian Peninsula ===
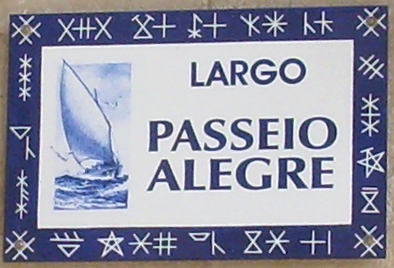
A street plate in Póvoa de Varzim, Portugal, with Siglas poveiras (describing names of local families), related with Scandinavian Bomärken. The drawn boat is a Lancha Poveira - some researchers say it is derived from the archetypal Viking ship.

Compared with the rest of Western Europe, the Iberian Peninsula seems to have been less affected by Viking activity, either in the Christian north or the Muslim south. In some of their raids on Iberia, the Vikings were crushed either by the Kingdom of Asturias or the Umayyad Emirate armies.

Knowledge of Vikings in Iberia is mainly based on written accounts, many of which are much later than the events they purport to describe, and often also ambiguous about the origins or ethnicity of the raiders they mention. A little possible archaeological evidence has come to light, but research in this area is ongoing. Viking activity in the Iberian peninsula seems to have begun around the mid-9th century as an extension of their raids on and establishment of bases in Frankia in the earlier 9th century, Vikings may have over-wintered for trading or settlement in northwestern Iberia.

The most prominent event was a raid in 844, when Vikings entered the Garonne and attacked Galicia and Asturias. When the Vikings attacked La Coruña they were met by the army of King Ramiro I and were heavily defeated. Many of the Vikings' casualties were caused by the Galicians' ballistas – powerful torsion-powered projectile weapons that looked rather like giant crossbows. Seventy of the Vikings' longships were captured on the beach and burned. They then proceeded south, raiding Lisbon and Seville. This Viking raid on Seville seems to have constituted a significant attack.

Another Viking raid occurred from 859 to 861, apparently by a single group. Despite some elaborate tales in late sources, little is known about these attacks. After raids on both northern Iberia and Al-Andalus, one of which in 859 resulted in the capture and exorbitant ransom of King García Íñiguez of Pamplona, the Vikings seem also to have raided other Mediterranean targets – possibly but not certainly including Italy, Alexandria, and Constantinople − and perhaps overwintering in Francia.

Evidence of Viking activity in Iberia between the 860s and 960s–70s ceases, when a range of sources including Dudo of Saint-Quentin, Ibn Ḥayyān, and Ibn Idhārī, along with a number of charters from Christian Iberia, afford convincing evidence for Viking raids on Iberia in the 960s and 970s. Tenth- or eleventh-century fragments of mouse bone found in Madeira, along with mitocondrial DNA of Madeiran mice, suggests that Vikings came to Madeira (bringing mice with them), long before the island was colonised by Portugal. Quite extensive evidence for minor Viking raids in Iberia continues for the early 11th century in later narratives (including some Icelandic sagas) and in northern Iberian charters.

In Portugal, it is believed that small Norse fishing settlements occurred sometime from the 9th century onwards, particularly along the Póvoa de Varzim coastline. Traditional marcas there, bear strong resemblance to the Viking bomärken, the traditional Poveiro boats are similar to longships, and historical incidence of Norse features in the local populations has also been noted. As the Viking Age drew to a close, Scandinavians and Normans continued to have opportunities to visit and raid Iberia while on their way to the Holy Land for pilgrimage or crusade, or in connection with Norman conquests in the Mediterranean. Key examples in the saga literature are King Sigurðr Jórsalafari and Røgnvaldr kali Kolsson.

=== Italy and Sicily ===
Around 860, Ermentarius of Noirmoutier and the Annals of St-Bertin provide contemporary evidence for Vikings based in Frankia proceeding to Iberia and thence to Italy. Three or four 11th-century Swedish runestones mention Italy, memorialising warriors who died in 'Langbarðaland', the Old Norse name for southern Italy (Longobardia). It seems clear that rather than being Normans, these men were Varangian mercenaries fighting for Byzantium. Varangians may first have been deployed as mercenaries in Italy against the Arabs as early as 936.

Later, several Anglo-Danish and Norwegian nobles participated in the Norman conquest of southern Italy. Harald Hardrada, who later became king of Norway, seems to have been involved in the Norman conquest of Sicily between 1038 and 1040, under William de Hauteville, who won his nickname Iron Arm by defeating the emir of Syracuse in single combat, and a Lombard contingent, led by Arduin. Edgar Ætheling, who left England in 1086, went there; Jarl Erling Skakke won his nickname after a battle against Arabs in Sicily. On the other hand, many Anglo-Danish rebels fleeing William the Conqueror, joined the Byzantines in their struggle against Robert Guiscard, duke of Apulia, in southern Italy.

In the spring of 1109, as reported in Snorre Sturlason's Heimskringla and in the Morkinskinna, King Sigurd I of Norway arrived in Sicily (Sikileyjar), where he and his entrouage were welcomed by Duke Roger II of Hauteville in his castle in Palermo, who was only 13–14 years old at the time. Sigurd stayed for a long time at Roger's court. On this occasion Sigurd enthroned Roger, proclaiming him king of Sicily, thus defining the genesis and descent of the kings of Sicily from Odin, progenitor of the Scandinavian dynasties. About 20 years later Roger II was again proclaimed and invested as king, with the foundation of the Kingdom of Sicily in 1130.

=== Finland and Baltics ===
As reported in several Norse sagas, by the 9th century a semi-legendary Viking ruler, King Eric Anundsson of the Swedes was successful in extending his realm over the Baltic Sea, albeit he was not successful in attempts of westward expansion. In one part of the Heimskringla, Thorgny Lawspeaker writes:

My grandfather Thorgny could well remember the king Eirik Eymundson of Uppsala and told of him that when he was in his best years he went out eastward every summer on expeditions to various countries, and conquered for himself Finland, Karelia, Courland, Estonia, and all the countries around; and at the present day the hillforts, ramparts, and other great works he had made are there to be seen.

=== Eastern Europe ===
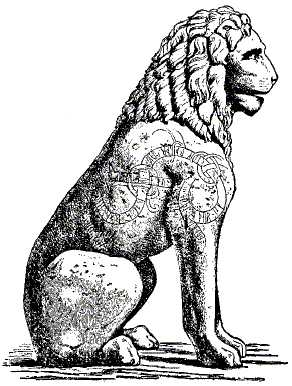
In Athens, Greece, Swedish Vikings wrote a runic inscription on the Piraeus Lion

The Vikings settled coastal areas along the Baltic Sea and along inland rivers in what is now Russian territories such as Staraya Ladoga, Novgorod and along major waterways to the Byzantine Empire. The Varangians or Varyags (Russian, Ukrainian: Варяги, Varyagi) were Scandinavians who migrated eastwards and southwards through what is now Russia, Belarus, and Ukraine mainly in the 9th and 10th centuries. Engaging in trade, colonization, piracy and mercenary activities, they roamed the river systems and portages of Garðaríki, reaching and settling at the Caspian Sea and in Constantinople.

The real involvement of the Varangians is said to have come after they were asked by the Slavic tribes of the region to come and establish order, as those tribes were in constant warfare among each other ("Our country is rich and immense, but it is rent by disorder. Come and govern us and reign over us."). The tribes were united and ruled under the leadership of Rurik. His successors conquered Kiev and established control of the trade route extending from Novgorod to the Black Sea through the Dnieper river. This Rurik dynasty went on to maintain their control over the Kievan Rus' and then Muscovy until 1598.

=== Caucasus and Georgia ===
Ingvar the Far-Travelled led expeditions to Iran and the Caucasus between 1036 and 1042. His travels are recorded on the Ingvar runestones. Around 1036, Varangians appeared near the village of Bashi on the Rioni river to establish a permanent settlement of Vikings in Georgia. The Georgian Chronicles describe them as 3,000 men who had traveled from Scandinavia through present-day Russia, rowing down the Dnieper and across the Black Sea. King Bagrat IV welcomed them to Georgia and accepted some of them into the Georgian army; several hundred Vikings fought on Bagrat's side at the Battle of Sasireti in 1042.

== North Atlantic ==
=== Iceland ===
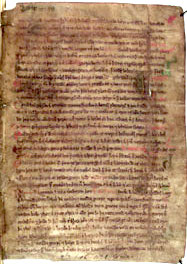
A page from a skin manuscript of Landnámabók in the Árni Magnússon Institute for Icelandic Studies in Reykjavík, Iceland

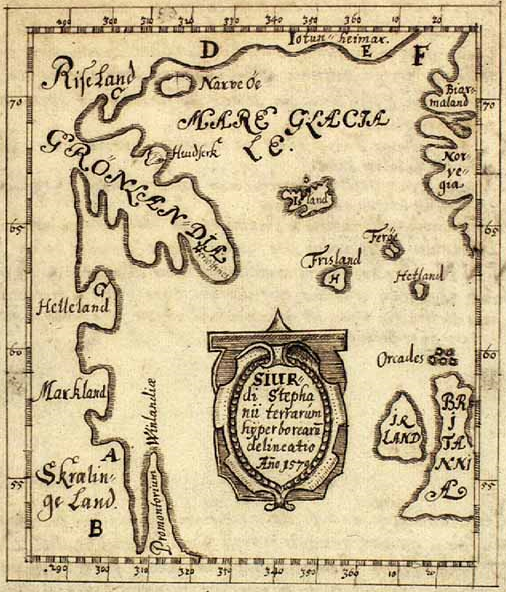
The Skálholt Map showing Latinized Norse placenames in the North Atlantic: Iotun-heimar (Jötunheimr); Riseland (Land of the Risi); Grönlandia (Greenland); Helleland (Helluland); Markland; Skrælinge Land (Land of the Skræling); Promontorium Winlandiæ (Promontory of Vinland)

Iceland was discovered by Naddodd, one of the first settlers on the Faroe Islands, who was sailing from Norway to the Faroe Islands but got lost and drifted to the east coast of Iceland. Naddoddr named the country Snæland (Snowland). Swedish sailor Garðar Svavarsson also accidentally drifted to the coast of Iceland. He discovered that the country was an island and named it Garðarshólmi (literally Garðar's Islet) and stayed for the winter at Húsavík. The first Scandinavian who deliberately sailed to Garðarshólmi was Flóki Vilgerðarson, also known as Hrafna-Flóki (Raven-Flóki). Flóki settled for one winter at Barðaströnd. It was a cold winter, and when he spotted some drift ice in the fjords he gave the island its current name, Ísland (Iceland).

Iceland was first settled around 870. The first permanent settler in Iceland is usually considered to have been a Norwegian chieftain named Ingólfr Arnarson. According to the story, he threw two carved pillars overboard as he neared land, vowing to settle wherever they landed. He then sailed along the coast until the pillars were found in the southwestern peninsula, now known as Reykjanesskagi. There he settled with his family around 874, in a place he named Reykjavík (Bay of Smokes) due to the geothermal steam rising from the earth. It is recognized, however, that Ingólfur Arnarson may not have been the first one to settle permanently in Iceland – that may have been Náttfari, a slave of Garðar Svavarsson who stayed behind when his master returned to Scandinavia.

=== Greenland ===
In 985, Erik the Red is believed to have discovered Greenland after being exiled from Iceland for murder in 982. In 986, Erik the Red returned with 14 surviving ships (25 ships set out on the expedition). Two areas along Greenland's southwest coast were colonised by Norse settlers, including Erik the Red, around 986. The land was marginal for Norse pastoral farming. The settlers arrived during a warm phase, when short-season crops such as rye and barley could be grown. Sheep and hardy cattle were raised for food, wool, and hides. Their main export was walrus ivory, which was traded for iron and other goods which could not be produced locally. Greenland became a dependency of the king of Norway in 1261. During the 13th century, the population may have reached as high as 5,000, divided between the two main settlements of Eystribygð (Eastern Settlement) and Vestribygð (Western Settlement). The organisation of these settlements revolved mainly around religion, and they consisted of around 250 farms which were split into approximately 14 communities that were centred around 14 churches, one of which was a cathedral at Garðar. The Catholic diocese of Greenland was subject to the archdiocese of Nidaros; many bishops chose to exercise this office from afar. As the years wore on, the climate cooled. In 1379 the northernmost settlement was attacked by the Skræling (Norse word for Inuit). Crops failed and trade declined. The Greenland colony gradually faded away. By 1450 the colony had lost contact with Norway and Iceland and disappeared from all but a few Scandinavian legends.

=== North America ===
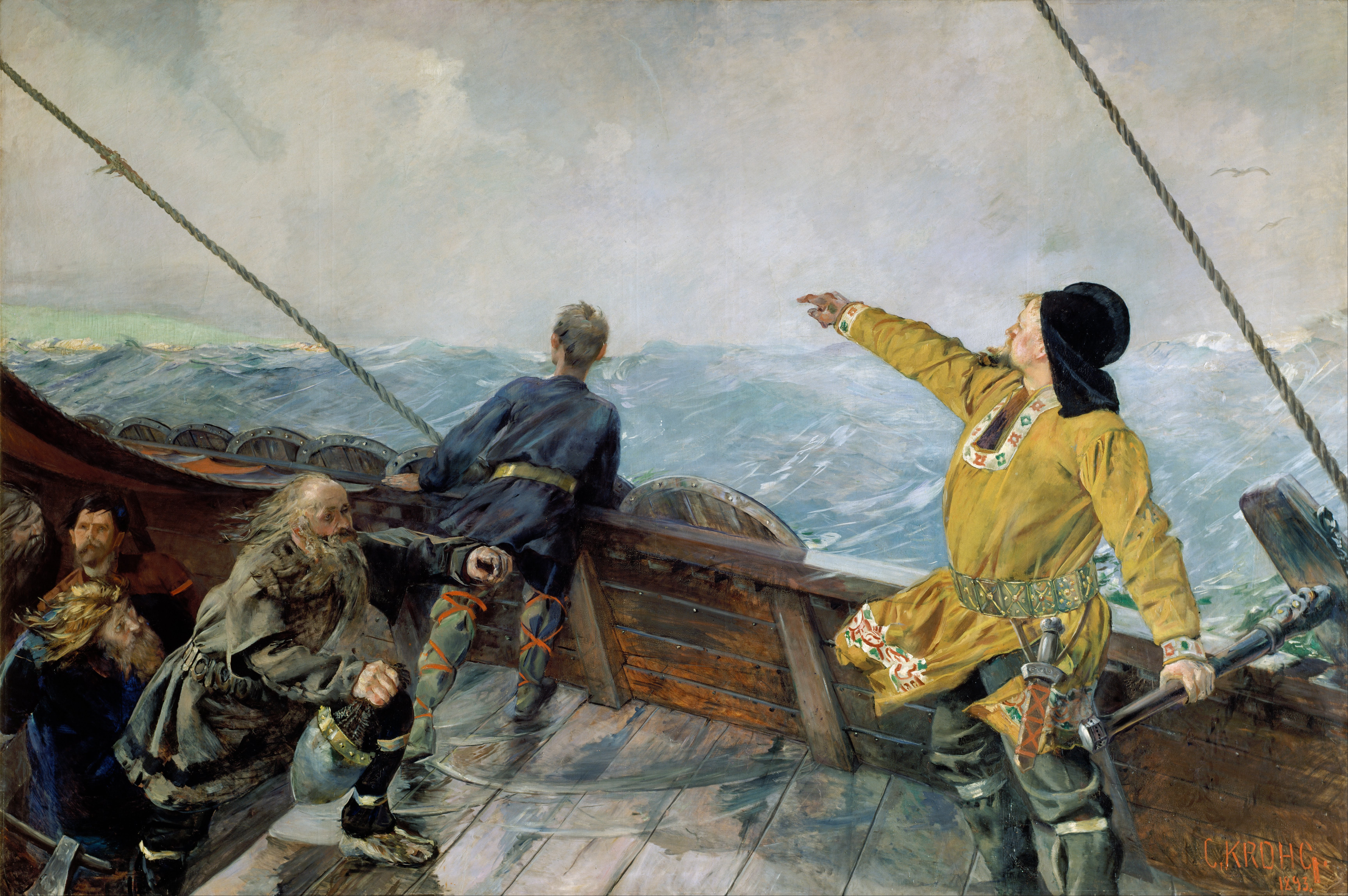
Leiv Eirikson Discovering America by Christian Krohg, 1893

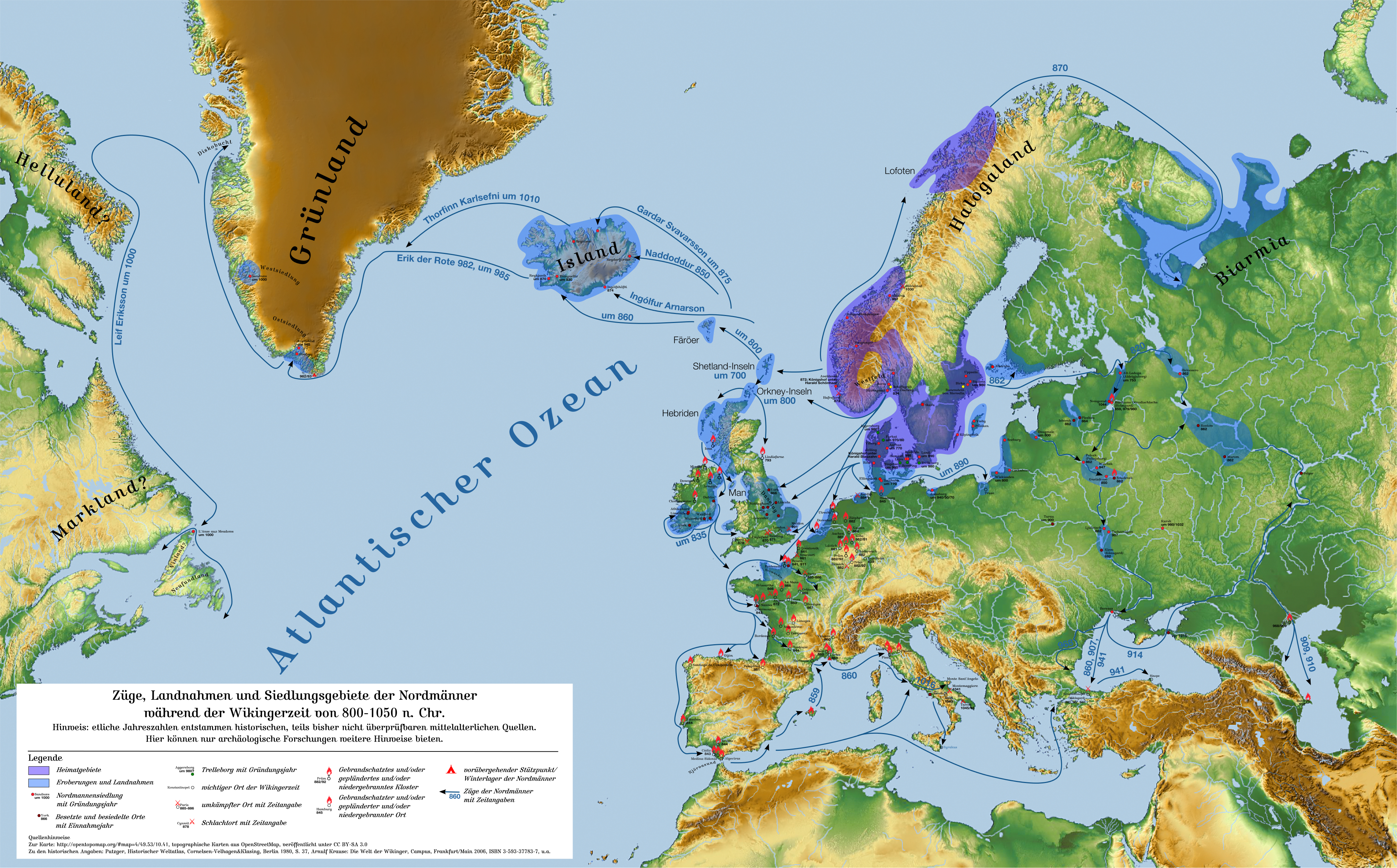
Exploration and expansion routes of Norsemen

Icelandic explorer Bjarni Herjólfsson first came across a part of the North American continent ca. 985 when he was blown off course sailing to Greenland from Iceland. Subsequent expeditions from Greenland (some led by Leif Erikson) explored the areas to the west, seeking large timbers for building in particular (Greenland had only small trees and brush). Regular activity from Greenland extended to Ellesmere Island, Skraeling Island and Ruin Island for hunting and trading with Inuit groups. A short-lived settlement was established at L'Anse aux Meadows. Wood from timber-framed buildings in the settlement was dated by a solar storm in 993 which caused a spike in carbon-14 in the dendrochronological layer for the year. Tree rings were counted from that year on three separate logs from the settlement, and all three were found to have been felled in 1021, indicating that the settlement was occupied at that date.

There is also evidence for Viking contact with Native Americans. The Vikings referred to them as the Skræling ("barbarians" or "puny, weaklings"). Fighting between the natives and the Vikings took place with the natives having the advanced weaponry of bows and arrows. Trade by barter also took place between them; however, the conflict led to the Vikings' eventual evacuation of the area.

The Greenlanders called the new-found territory Vinland. It is unclear whether Vinland referred to in the traditionally thinking as Vínland (wine-land) or more recently as Vinland (meadow- or pasture-land). In any case, without any official backing, attempts at colonization by the Norse proved failures. There were too many natives for the Greenlanders to conquer or withstand, and they withdrew to Greenland.

=== Svalbard ===
Vikings may have discovered Svalbard as early as the 12th century. Traditional Norse accounts exist of a land known as Svalbarð – literally "cold shores". This land might also have been Jan Mayen or a part of eastern Greenland. The Dutchman Willem Barents made the first indisputable discovery of Svalbard in 1596.

=== Azores ===
Multiple studies suggest the idea that the Norse could have reached the Azores islands and settled there between 700 and 850. For example, a 2015 study showed that there were substantial mitochondrial DNA similarities between mice living in the Azores and Scandinavia, and the idea was put forward that they might have travelled on Viking ships from there.

Another study from 2021 collected cylindrical sediment cores from five lakes on various islands of the archipelago, trying to describe the climatic history of the region. The study found in the sediment layer corresponding to the years between 700 and 850, an unusual uptick in the organic compound called 5-beta-stigmastanol, which is found in the feces of ruminants such as cows or sheep. In addition, a decrease in native tree pollen and an increase in carbon particles was noted at this time, suggesting that the islands' early settlers felled the trees and burned them, perhaps to make room for the ruminants they brought with them. More livestock fecal sterols and carbon particles from 950 onwards were also found continuously in Lake Peixinho at Pico Island, and more punctually in Lake Caldeirão at Corvo Island. The same study found pollen from Secale cereale (non-native) on Pico Island dated to around 1150 and on São Miguel to around 1300.

Climate simulations indicate that at that time the prevailing winds from the North Atlantic came from the northeast, making navigation from Scandinavia more or less direct and at the same time difficult to navigate from the east, which could indicate that these early settlers of the islands would not have come from Portugal but from northern lands. Despite the prevailing winds coming from the north, this would not make navigation from the east impossible, and geographer Simon Connor notes on the subject of mice that thanks to the trade routes already established at the time, a mouse from Scandinavia could have arrived by boat in what is now Portugal, and from there it would have taken another course towards the Azores

== Asia ==
=== Levant ===
Harald Hardrada served the Byzantine emperor in Constantinople, raiding North Africa, the Middle East as far east as Armenia, and the island of Sicily in the 11th century, as recounted in his saga in Heimskringla. Evidence for Norse ventures into Arabia and Central Asia can be found in runestones erected in Scandinavia by the relatives of fallen Viking adventurers. Several of these refer to men who died in "Serkland". In the eastern Mediterranean, the Norse (referred to as Rus') were viewed more as "merchant-warriors" who were primarily associated with trade and business. At times, this trading relationship would break down into violence – Rus' armadas raided in the Caspian on at least three occasions, in 910, 912 and 943.

== Genetic evidence and implications ==
Studies of genetic diversity have provided scientific confirmation to accompany archaeological evidence of Viking expansion. They also indicate patterns of ancestry, imply new migrations, and show the actual flow of individuals between disparate regions. However, attempts to determine historical population genetics are complicated by subsequent migrations and demographic fluctuations. In particular, the rapid migrations of the 20th century have made it difficult to assess what prior genetic states were.

Genetic evidence contradicts the common perception that Vikings were primarily pillagers and raiders. A news article by Roger Highfield summarizes recent research and concludes that, as both male and female genetic markers are present, the evidence is indicative of colonization instead of raiding and occupying. However, this is also disputed by unequal ratios of male and female haplotypes (see below) which indicate that more men settled than women, an element of a raiding or occupying population.

=== Mitochondrial and Y-chromosome haplotypes ===
Y-chromosome haplotypes serve as markers of paternal lineage much the same as mDNA represents the maternal lineage. Together, these two methods provide an option for tracing back a people's genetic history and charting the historical migrations of both males and females.

Often considered the purest remnants of ancient Nordic genetics, Icelanders trace 75% to 80% of their patrilineal ancestry to Scandinavia and 20% to 25% to Scotland and Ireland. On the maternal side, only 37% is from Scandinavia, and the remaining 63% is mostly Scottish and Irish. Iceland holds one of the more well-documented lineage records which, in many cases, go back 15 generations and at least 300 years. These are accompanied by one of the larger genetic records that have been collected by deCODE genetics. Together, these two records allow for a mostly reliable view of historical Scandinavian genetic structure although the genetics of Iceland are influenced by Norse-British migration as well as that directly from Scandinavia.

Haplogroup I-M253, also known as haplogroup I1, is the most common haplotype among Scandinavian males. It is present in 35% of males in Norway, Denmark and Sweden; 40% of males within Western Finland. It is also prominent on the Baltic and North Sea coasts, but decreases further south. Haplogroup R1b is another very common haplotype in all of Western Europe. However, it is not distinctly linked to Vikings or their expansion. There are indications that a mutant strand, R-L165, may have been carried to Great Britain by the Vikings, but the topic is currently inconclusive.

The mitochondrial C1 haplotype is primarily an East Asia-American haplotype that developed just prior to migration across the Bering sea. This maternal haplotype, however, was found in several Icelandic samples. While originally considered to be a 20th-century immigrant, a more complete analysis has shown that this haplotype has been present in Iceland for at least 300 years and is distinct from other C1 lineages. This evidence indicates a likely genetic exchange back and forth between Iceland, Greenland, and Vinland.

There is evidence suggesting Y-haplotypes may be combined with surname histories to better represent historical populations and prevent recent migrations from obscuring the historical record. Cys282Tyr (or C282Y) is a mutation in the HFE gene that has been linked to most cases of hereditary hemochromatosis. Genetic techniques indicate that this mutation occurred roughly 60–70 generations ago or between 600 and 800, assuming a generation length of 20 years. The regional distribution of this mutation among European populations indicates that it originated in Southern Scandinavia and spread with Viking expansion. Due to the timing of the mutation and subsequent population movements, C282Y is very prominent in Great Britain, Normandy, and Southern Scandinavia although C282Y has been found in almost every population that has been in contact with the Vikings.

== See also ==
- The Exploration Museum
- Salme ships
- Pre-modern human migration
