= Ethnography and History Museum of Póvoa de Varzim =

Museu de Etnografia e História da Póvoa de Varzim
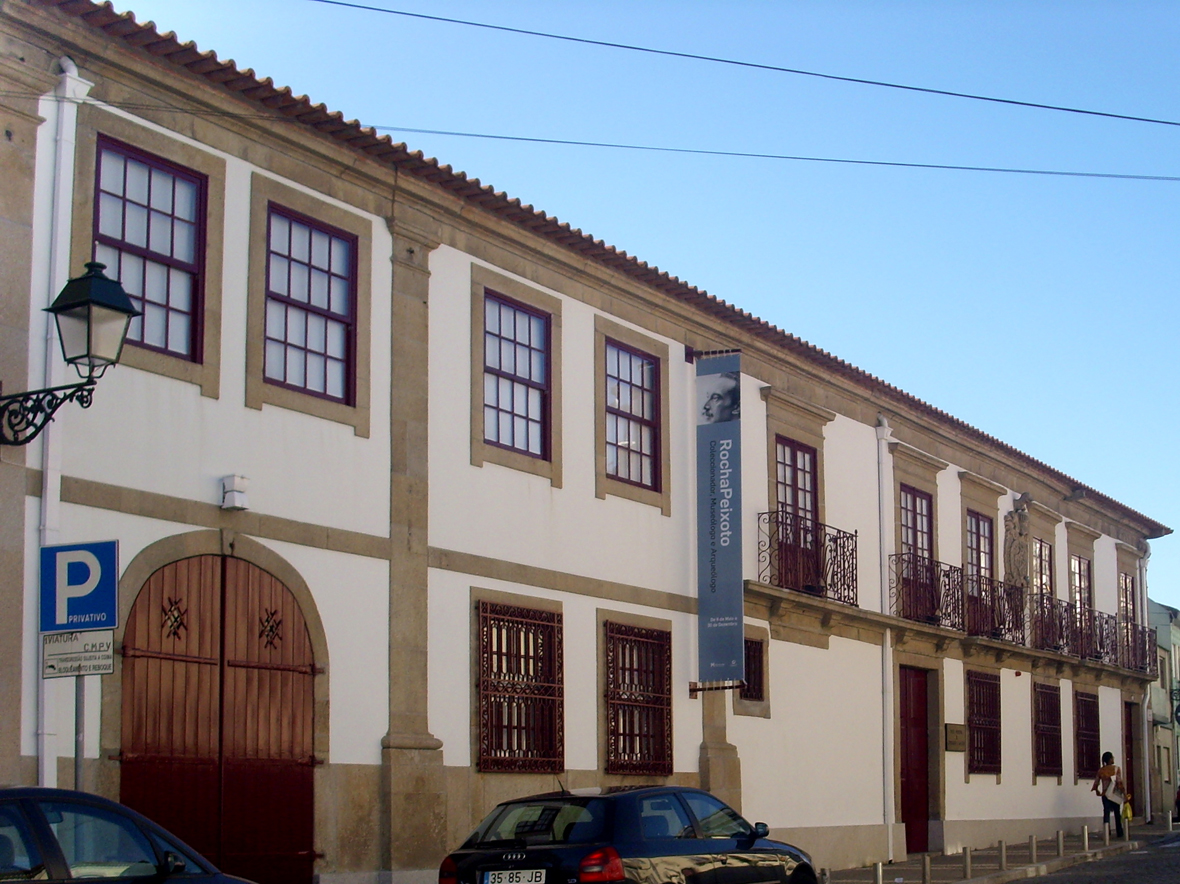
- Established: 1937
- Location: Rua Visconde de Azevedo, 17 4490-589 Póvoa de Varzim, Portugal
- Coordinates: 41.38055038°N 8.75821114°W
- Public transit access: Porto Metro (Póvoa de Varzim station - lines B, Bx); Litoral Norte Bus (Praça do Almada stop - line B)

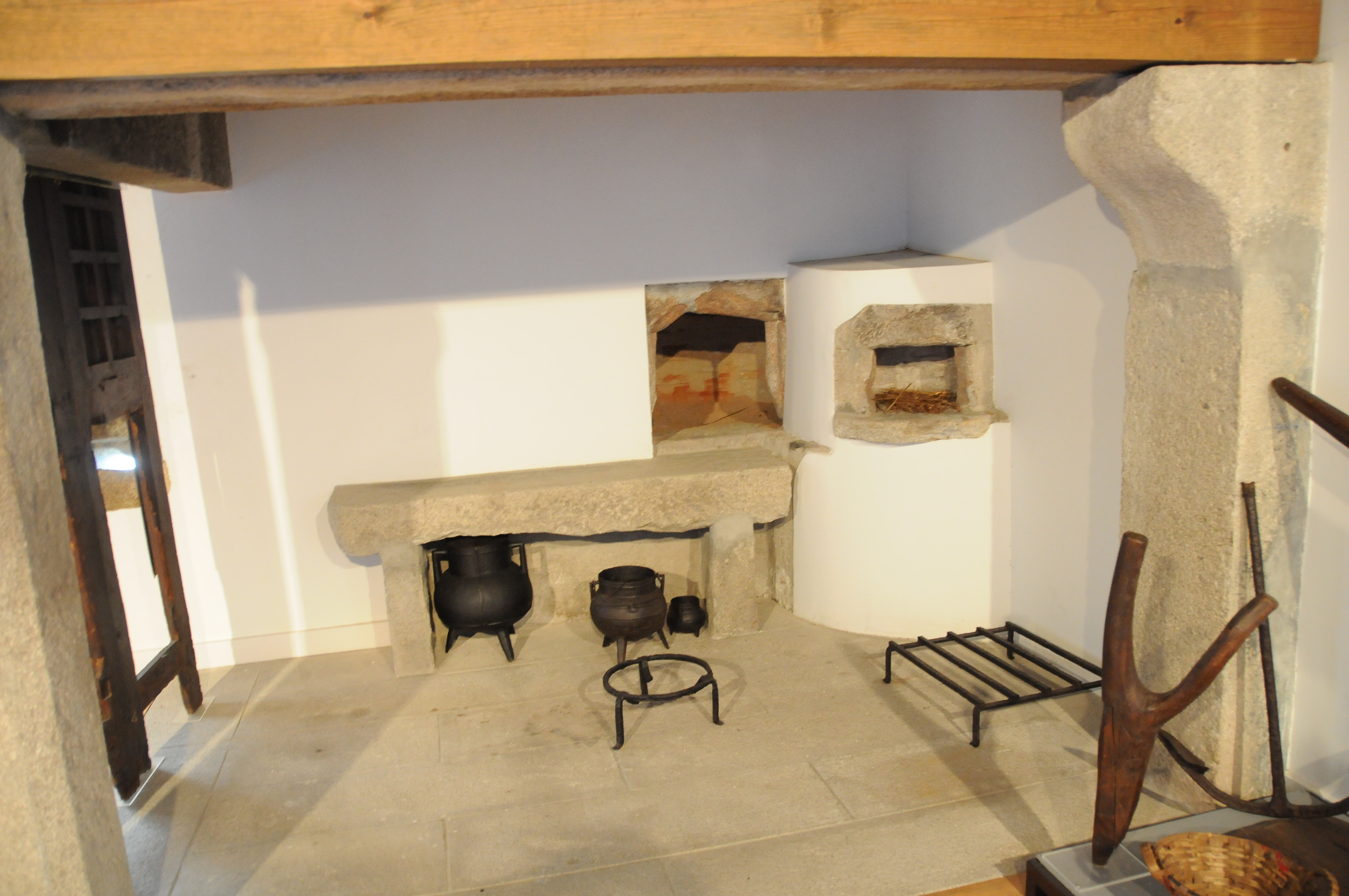
The building's original kitchen.

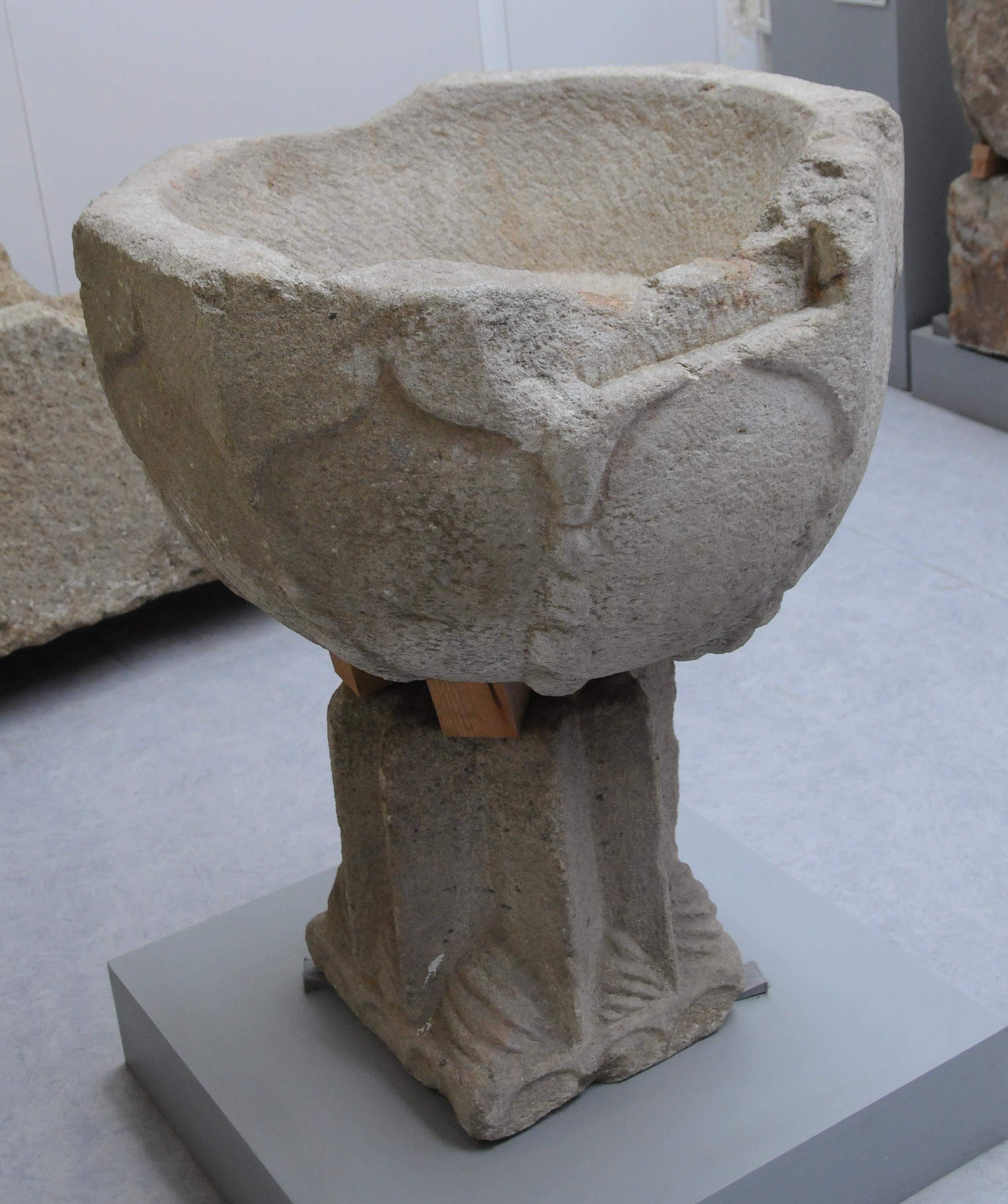
Baptismal font of the first church of Póvoa de Varzim, a Gothic-Romanesque temple demolished in the beginning of the 20th century.

Ethnography and History Museum of Póvoa de Varzim (Portuguese: Museu Municipal de Etnografia e História da Póvoa de Varzim) is a museum with a maritime and ethnic theme located in the Portuguese city of Póvoa de Varzim. The museum is located in Solar dos Carneiros, former home of the Viscount of Azevedo.

It is a 17th-century building, listed by IGESPAR as a property of public interest in Portugal. It became a museum in 1937 and is one of the oldest ethnographic museums in Portugal. The museum collection includes the permanent exhibition "Siglas Poveiras" that won the "European Museum of The Year Award" in 1980. It also includes Sacred art from the early main church, archaeological findings such as Roman inscriptions, Castro culture ceramics and other collections.

The museum has two extensions near historical sites: São Pedro de Rates Museum - for the history, legend and art surrounding the Romanesque Church of Rates and Cividade de Terroso Museum - a presentation with archaeological findings at the entrance of Cividade de Terroso, a Castro culture city.

== History ==
António dos Santos Graça, an ethnographer from the Povoan fisher community, published his work "O Poveiro" (The Povoan) in 1932. In the book, Santos Graça presented the cultural issues of the community in a clear, elaborated and attractive way, including important and curious aspects such as social structure, ancestry, and change. The First Regional Exhibition of Maritime Fishery of the Coast of Entre-Douro-e-Minho, held in Casino da Póvoa in October 1932, prompted the foundation of the museum by Santos Graça in 1937 in an attempt to preserve the practices and traditions of this community that were being rapidly lost without registration or academic studies.

Santos Graça rented the Solar dos Carneiros, a nobleman house, although he immediately saw that the building was not suited for the needs. The museum collection included objects from the museum created by António Augusto da Rocha Peixoto in 1907, the Archeology and History collection of Padre Brenha Museum (cataloged by Cândido Landolt in 1893); the Regional Museum of the local lyceum; Roman inscriptions; artifacts saved between 1916 and 1918 when the first church of Póvoa de Varzim was demolished and objects offered by the Santa Casa da Misericórdia.

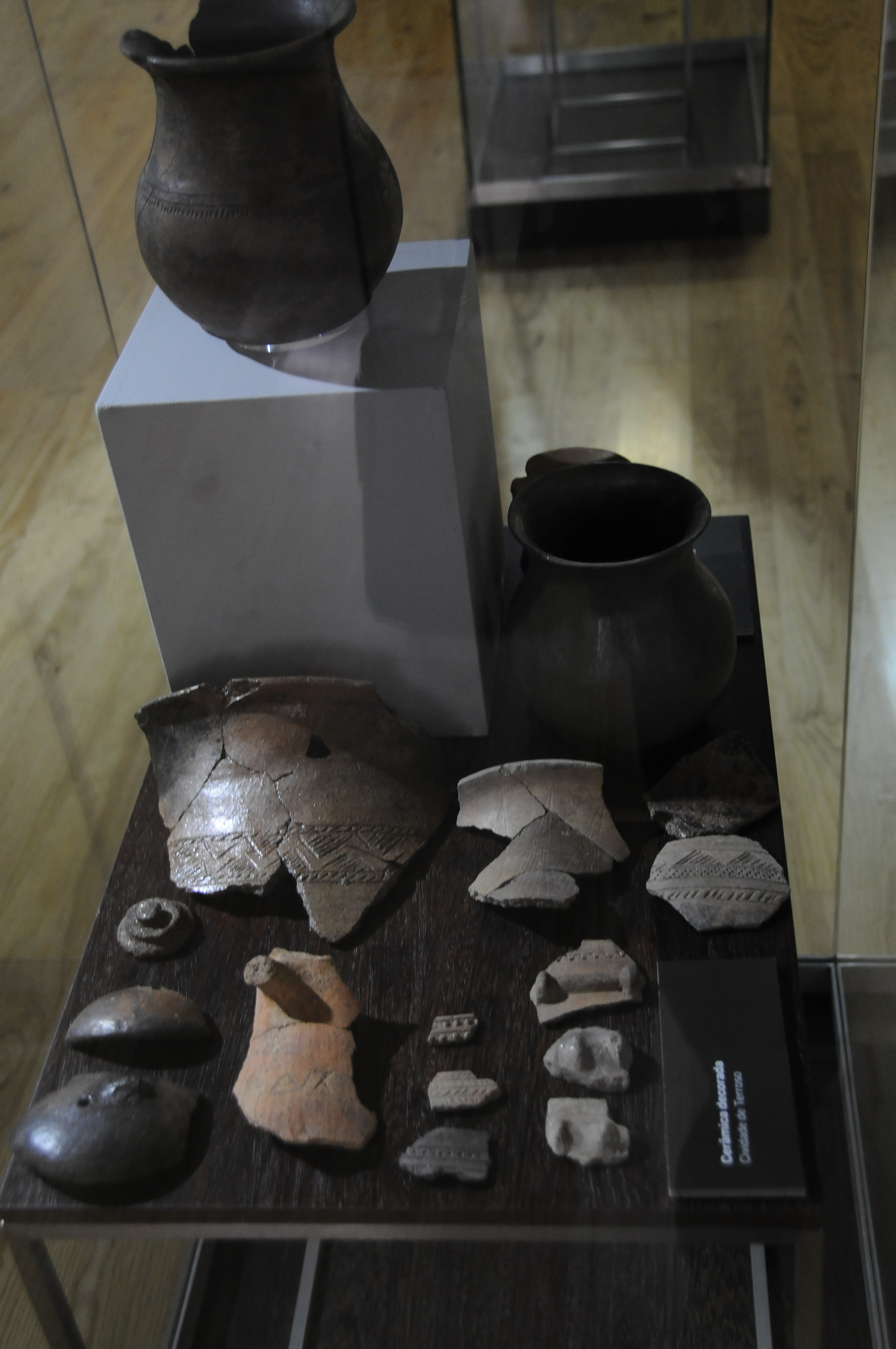
Castro culture pottery.

The museum, was for the years to come, considered a role model regarding maritime ethnography with thousands of visitors, the life, arts and traditions of the Povoan fisher and farmer communities were the most popular amongst visitors. Dolls presenting traditional games and cultural aspects of the community were created by Mestre Quilores.

When Santos Graça died in 1956, the museum started to decline and, in 1974, the building was bought by Póvoa de Varzim Town Hall to João do Ameal, Count of Ameal. The building was closed for works, but its collection kept being shown across Portugal and Europe, such as "Siglas Poveiras", winner of a 1980 International European Museum of the Year award, "Povoan costumes", "Archeology in the Municipality of Póvoa de Varzim"; "António Santos Graça - The Man and his Work", "Fishery, Sea Baths, Countryside life - a view of the community in times of change".

The historical building was declared, by the Portuguese national monuments institute, as of public importance in 1985. The museum reopened on September 7, 1985, and used for several temporary exhibits featuring diverse aspects of local History and Ethnography. The old dolls with scenes of traditional Povoan lifestyle and the tradition kitchen were recovered due to visitors pressure, a part of the museum that became known as the "museum of the museum".

The Ethnography and History Museum organized the reconstruction of Lancha Poveira Fé em Deus, a Poveiro boat in 1991 and opened an archeology section, important for the study of archaeological findings, such as the Roman Villa Mendo, the early Medieval Rates township and monastery, the Roman necropolis at Beiriz, and Cividade de Terroso, an important Iron Age settlement.

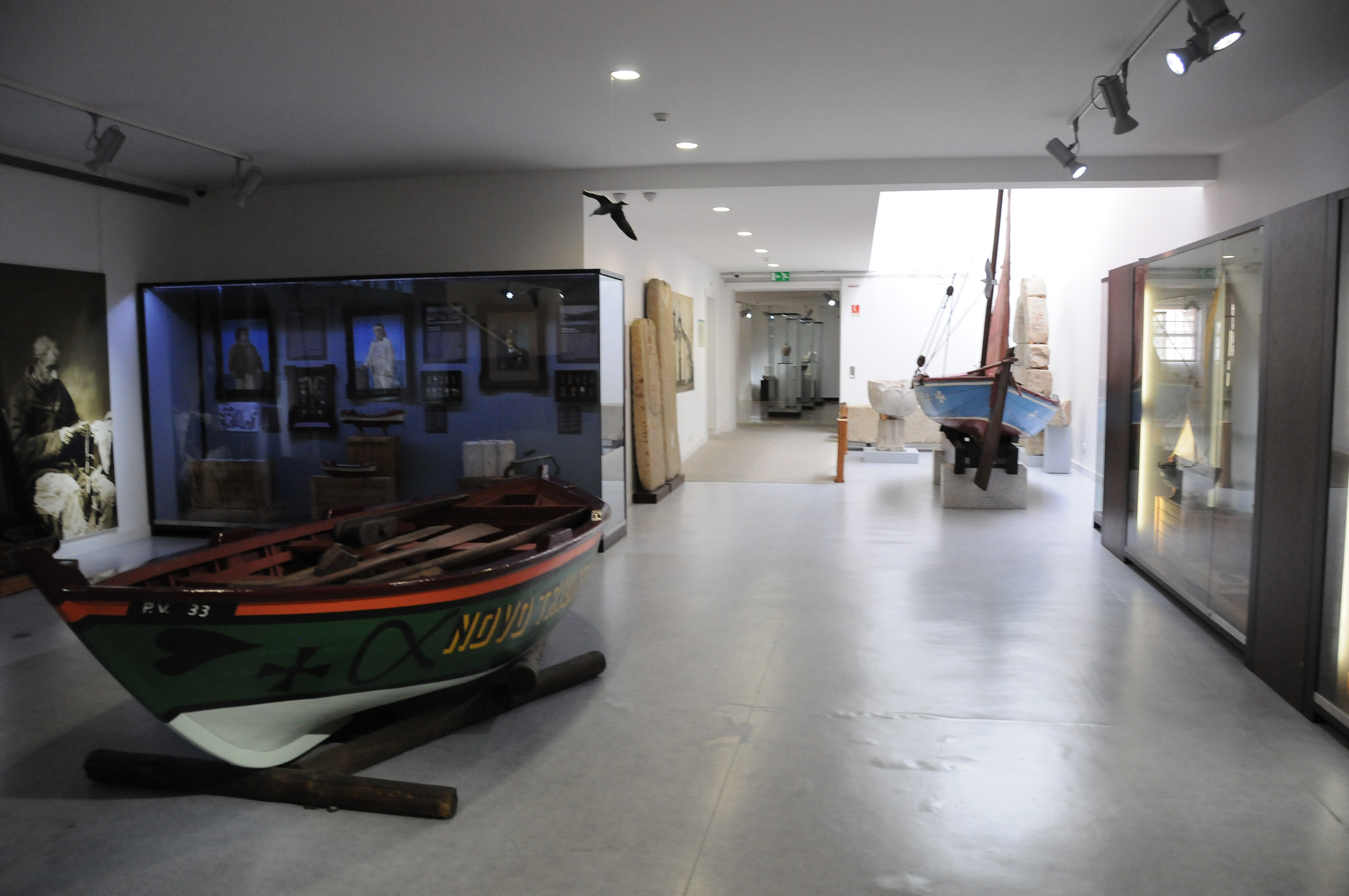
Poveiro boats in the museum.

== Permanent exhibitions ==
- Archeology nucleus: Roman and Castro culture artifacts;
- Kitchen: A real in-site ancient kitchen of a Povoan nobleman's house;
- Tragic Maritime History: Fisher community history;
- Chapel and ex-votos: Local religious art;
- Building a Lancha: Focusing on the ancient knowledge of Poveiro Boats;
- Rocha Peixoto, the Life and work of António Augusto da Rocha Peixoto;
- Traditional games, children's ancient games;
- Scenes of Povoan lifestyle, old dolls featuring traditional aspects of the local culture;
- Siglas Poveiras, On Siglas Poveiras script.
