= Poveiro (boat) =

Type of fishing vessel

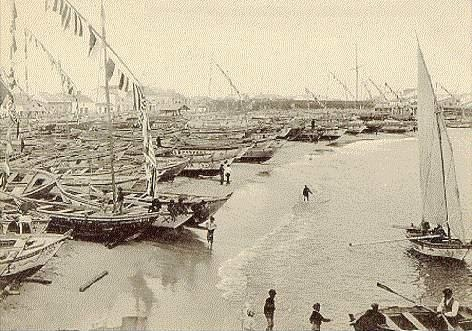
Poveiro boats in the Port of Póvoa de Varzim.

The Poveiro is a type of fishing vessel that was used for coastal and deep sea fishing from the Douro river in Northern Portugal to Galicia. It was use by the fishermen of Póvoa de Varzim and related communities in Northern Portugal.

It is characterized by a wide flat-bottom, curved stem and a deep helm. There were diverse boats with different sizes, uses and shapes, including catraia pequena, catraia grande, caíco and the most notable of which, the Lancha Poveira.

The Lancha Poveira or Lancha Poveira do Alto was a large ship adapted to deep waters and used for hake-fishing. The largest of which had twelve oars, usually four to seven oars, and could carry 2 to 32 men. Each boat carried carvings, namely a sigla poveira mark for individual boat identification and magical-religious protection at sea. The Lancha Poveira was considered by Lixa Filgueiras and Raul Brandão to be descendant from the Viking longboats, keeping all the longboat features but without a long stern and bow. The ship carried one mast with a lateen sail for better maneuvering.

The ancient shipbuilding knowledge preserved in Poveiro boats was, most possibly, due to the endogamy practiced in Póvoa de Varzim fisher community which protected several cultural traits specific of the town. Poveiro boats were widespread until the mid-20th century, and its use spread to Brazil, Angola and Mozambique and even Galicia were Povoan fishing colonies were established. Since the middle of the 20th century, modern technology and, especially, the use of trawlers dramatically reduced the number of Povoan boats.

Poveiro boats

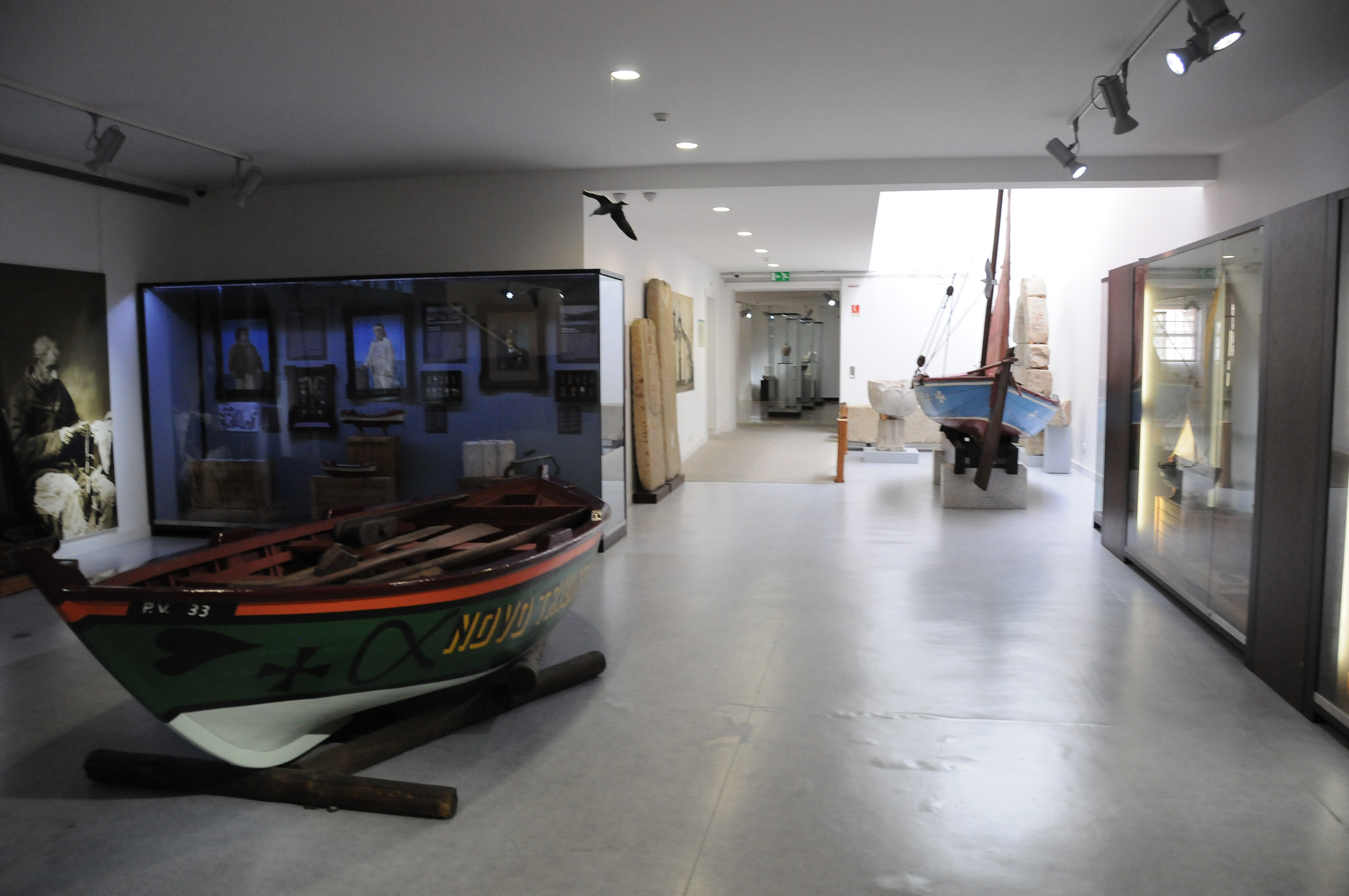
Poveiro boats preserved in the Ethnography and History Museum of Póvoa de Varzim

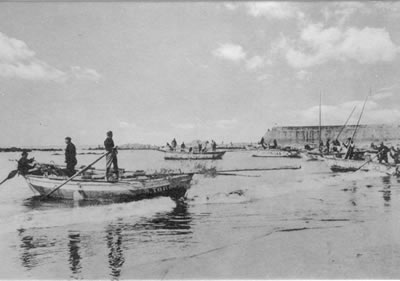
Ancient picture of the Port of Póvoa de Varzim

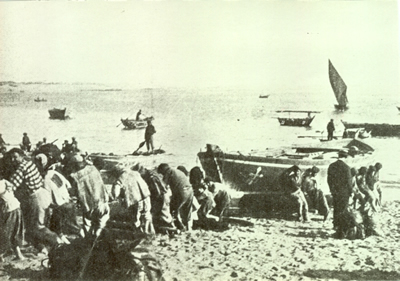
Ala-arriba

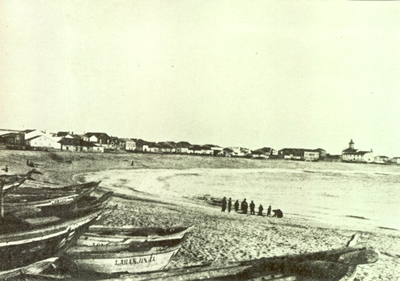
Boats in the sheltered bay and Bairro Sul, a fishermen quarter
