= House mark =

Property marker

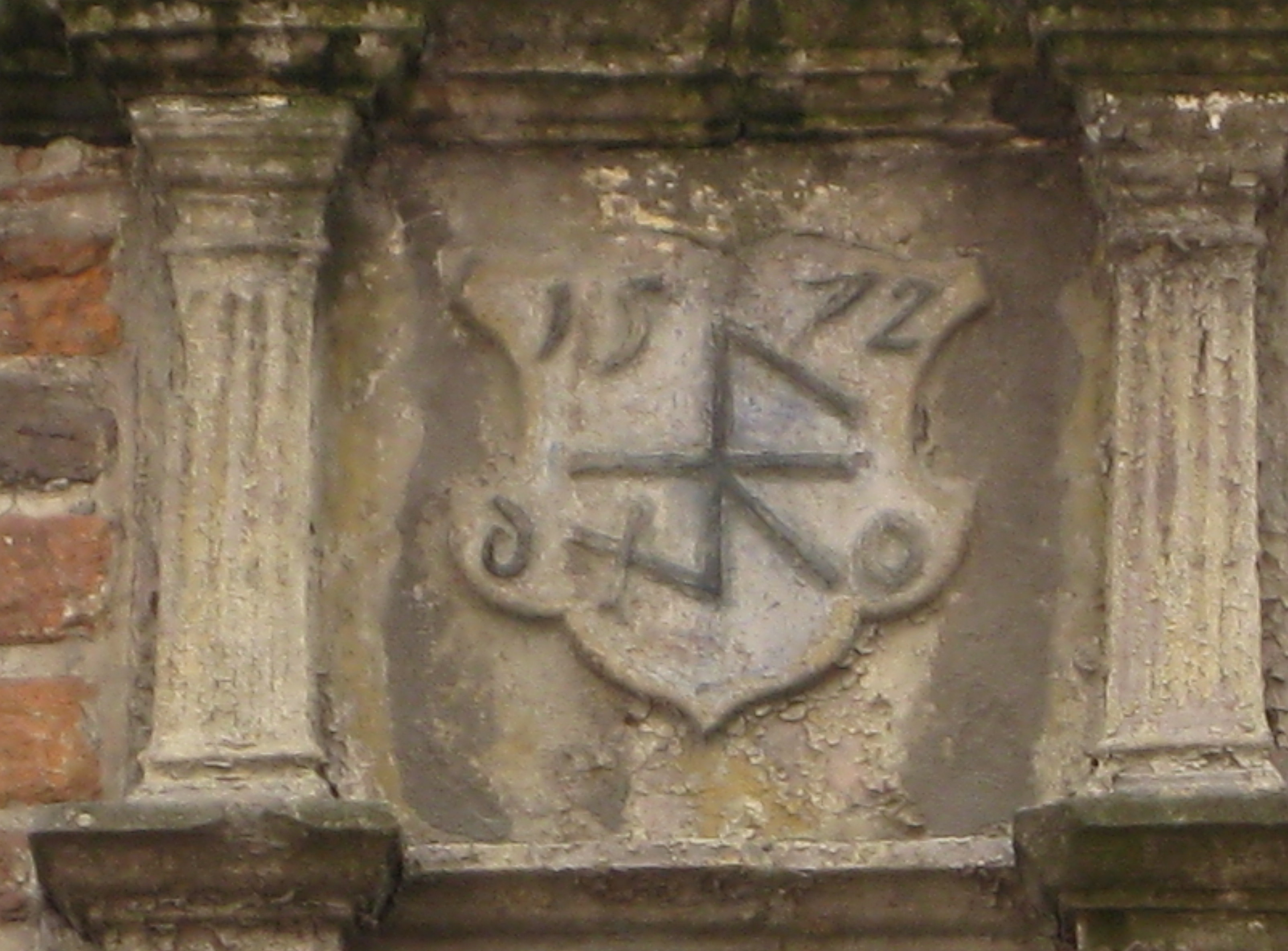
German house mark on a house front from 1572, with variation of the shape double hook.

A house mark was originally a mark of property, later also used as a family or clan emblem, incised on the facade of a building, on animals, in signet and similar in the farmer and burgher culture of Germany, the Netherlands and the Nordic countries.

These marks have the appearance of glyphs or runes consisting of a pattern of simple lines, without the application of colour.

== Description ==
The form of house marks is based on function. They should be easy to cut, scratch or engrave with a knife or similar tool. At the same time, they should be distinctive and easy to remember. House marks differ from the more complicated patterns of a coat of arms or flags, which include surfaces and solid colors.

House marks can be made from one or two lines and up to quite a complex pattern of line figures. Based on appearance, house marks resemble line figures in rock carvings and in early writing systems. It is unclear how extensively such ancient line figures were used as marks for people or property ownership.

The basic forms of a house mark is often runes, characters and numbers, stylized figures, international symbols like crosses, stars, and astrological or astronomical characters.

One characteristic of house marks is that they may consist of a basic form with addition or deduction of lines. In this way, related people can have marks that resemble each other, but differ by details. This is equivalent to cadency and adding brisures as a method to change a coat of arms.

Many house marks are placed in shield-shaped frames. We see this in seals, on buildings and on tombstones, for both farmers and city dwellers in Scandinavia and German areas, during the 1700s and 1800s. Some of these house mark shields also had color and approached the heraldic coat of arms.

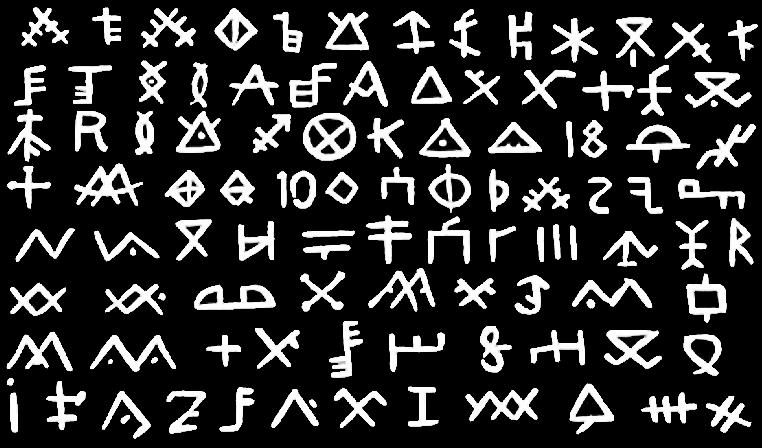
House marks from the island of Saaremaa, Estonia.

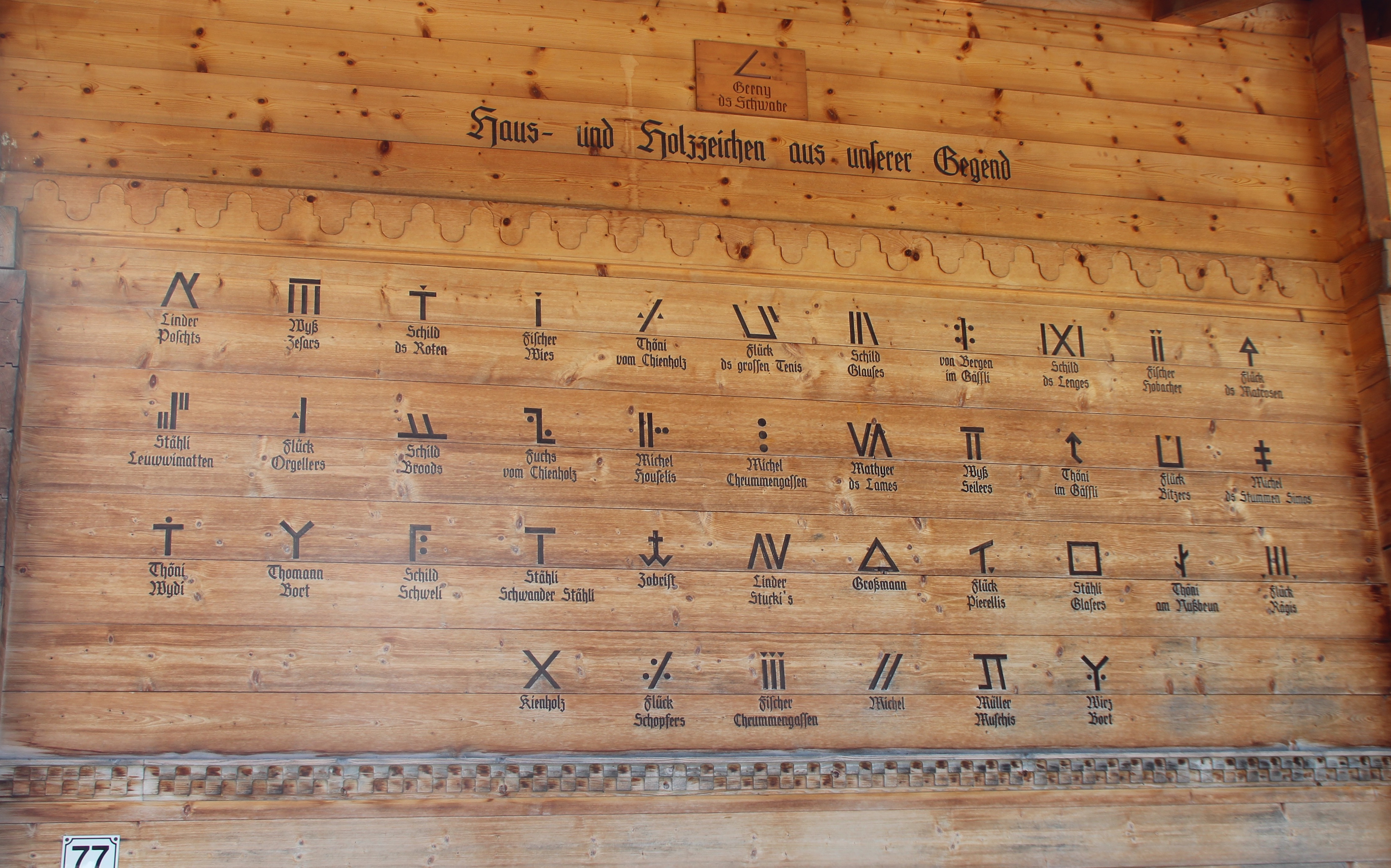
House marks from Brienz, Switzerland.

Some municipal coats of arms of Germany involve house marks, in this example the arms of Hiddensee, which show a house mark per pale alongside a sea-horse.

== History ==
The use of house marks dates back to long before literacy was common. The purpose of a house mark is to have a recognisable mark that a person, a nuclear family, multiple generations of an extended family or an owner of a property can use to mark objects, cattle, or buildings for recognition of ownership.

Besides farmers, house marks have also been used by merchants, tradesman, artisans, and other town burghers on for example Bryggen in Bergen, on building blocks in the Nidaros Cathedral, and on personal seals in other Norwegian cities. There are also house marks written by hand on documents, for instance house marks of mining workers at Røros.

The Norwegian word bomerke or boemerke probably came from Denmark. There is no Norwegian reference before the 17th century. Today bomerke is mainly written as bumerke in Norwegian. Both in Denmark and Sweden, the word bomerke (with multiple spellings) is used since the 14th century and in the 16th century. In the Icelandic codes of law from the Middle Ages, one finds the word einkunn used to denote owner marks used to tag animals. It is likely that this word has also been used in Norway.

In Finnish, the word puumerkki ("insignia") means a distinguishing mark or sign used by illiterate persons as a replacement of a written signature in official documents.

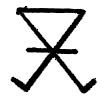
Norwegian house mark with a variation of the shape hourglass.

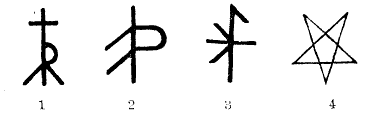
Two Icelandic and two Swedish house marks. The fourth is a mason's mark with pentagram from Uppsala Cathedral.

Examples of Kashubian house marks with variations of the basic forms of cross, arrow, and a double hook.

== See also ==
- Bind runes and cipher runes
- Brands
- Heraldry
- Mason's marks
- Merchant's marks
- Monogram
- Pseudo-runes
- Siglas poveiras
- Tamga
- Titulus pictus
