= Siglas poveiras =

Portuguese proto-writing system

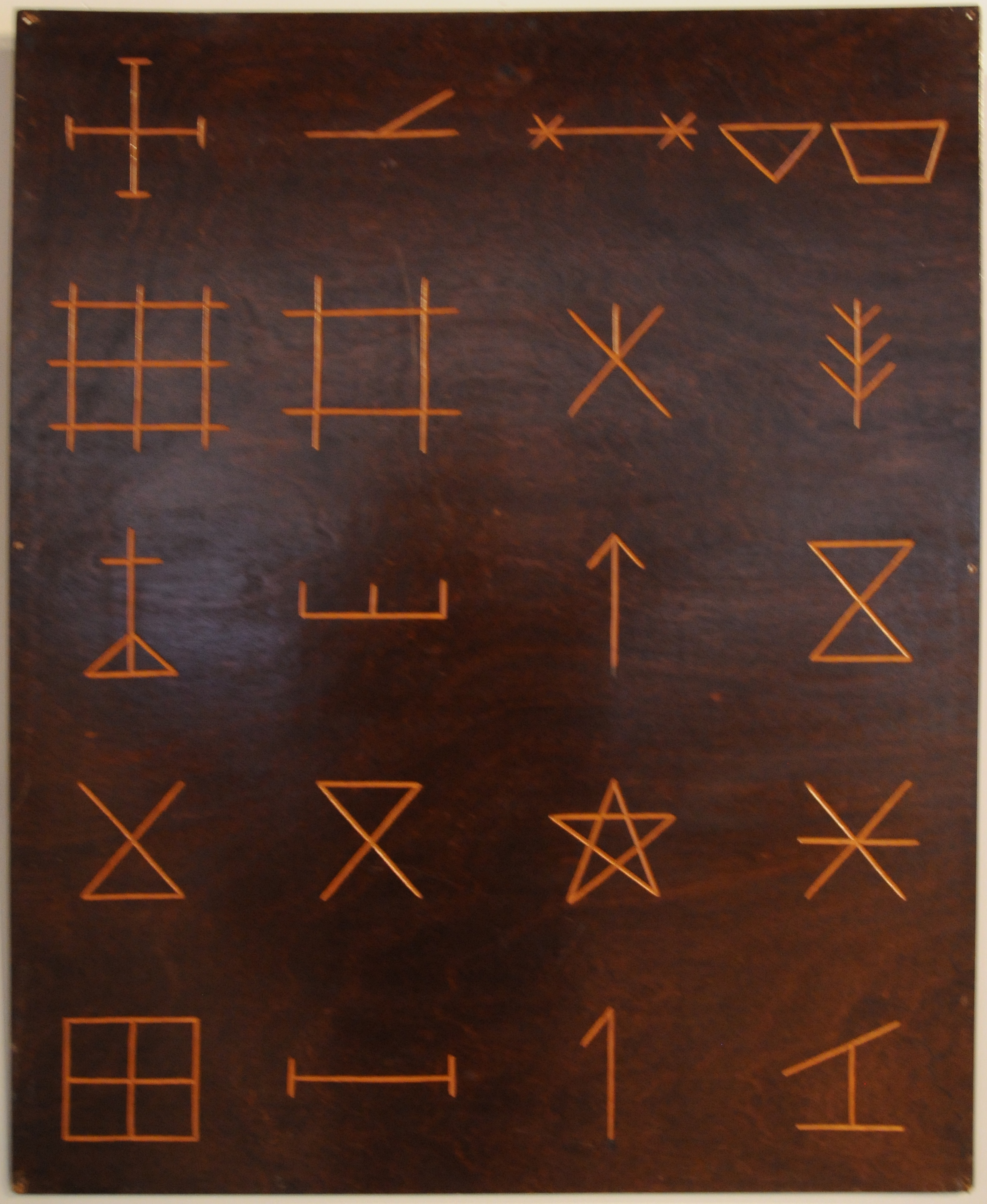
Siglas poveiras base symbols in the Ethnography Museum of Póvoa de Varzim.

The siglas poveiras (European Portuguese: [ˈsiɡlɐʒ pɔˈvɐjɾɐʃ], lit. 'Póvoa signs') or marcas poveiras (lit. 'Póvoa marks') are a proto-writing system that has been used by the local community of Póvoa de Varzim, Portugal, for many generations.

The signs were primarily used as signatures for family coats of arms to indicate family belongings. They were typically carved into a piece of wood using a razor, though painting them on boats and beach sheds was also a common practice.

The purpose of the siglas poveiras was to record history, leading them to be described as Póvoa's "writing system." However, since the siglas do not represent sounds or specific words, they are not considered a true writing system.

== Types ==
Lixa Filgueiras argued that there are two types of symbols, distinguished by their use: marcas (marks) and siglas. The marcas were primarily used to denote ownership and were therefore more commonly found. The siglas, on the other hand, were associated with magical and religious purposes. As symbols of a mythical nature, the siglas were rarer, both in their ancient and more recent forms.

Reference box for the types of siglas used in fishermen marks compared to the marks on the doors in the chapels of Balasar and Santa Tecla
Type	Póvoa de Varzim	Balasar	Santa Tecla
Religious Siglas	18	11	11
Magical Siglas	5	6	4
Maritime Siglas (total)	47	23	20
Boats or parts	32	12	13
Fishing	5	8	4
Penas	4	1	1
Pés de Galinha	6	2	2

== Family marks ==
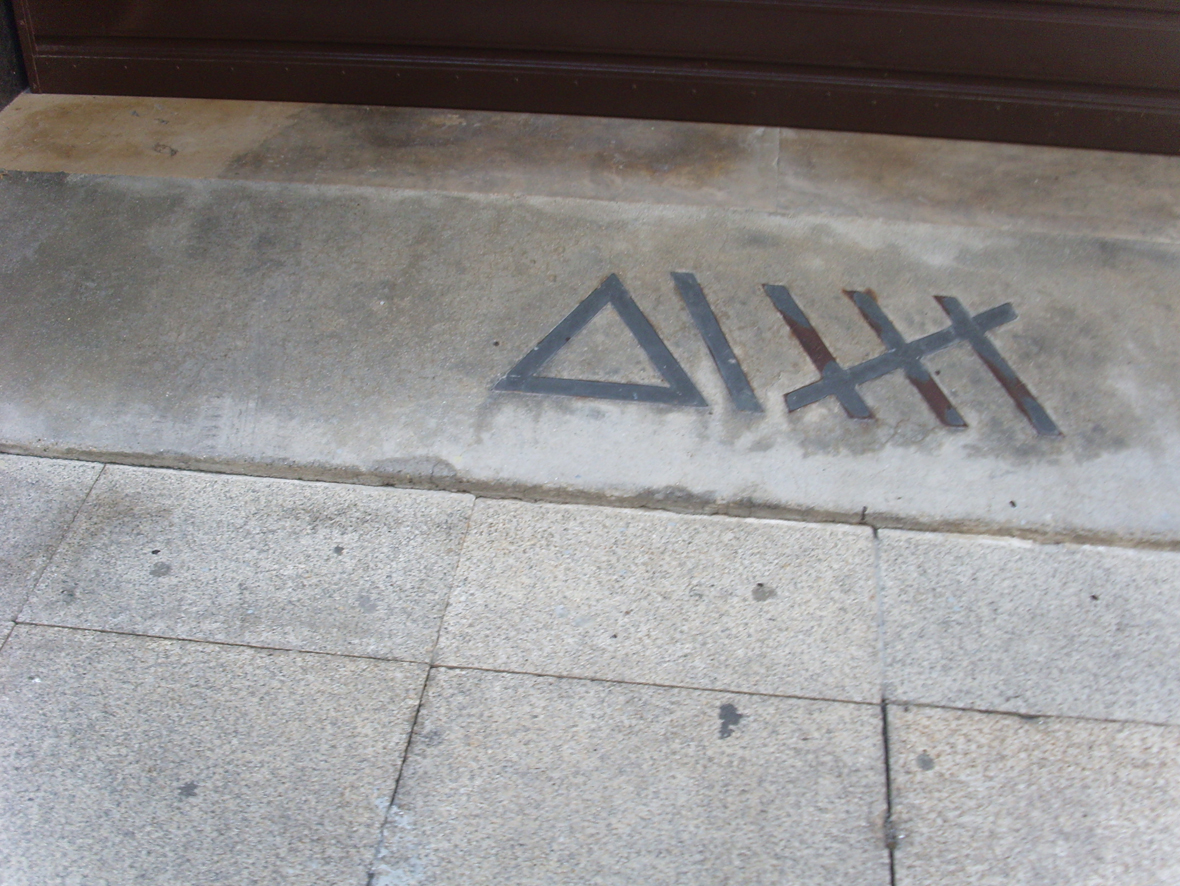
Family mark describing ownership of a private garage in Rua Cândido Landolt in Póvoa city center.

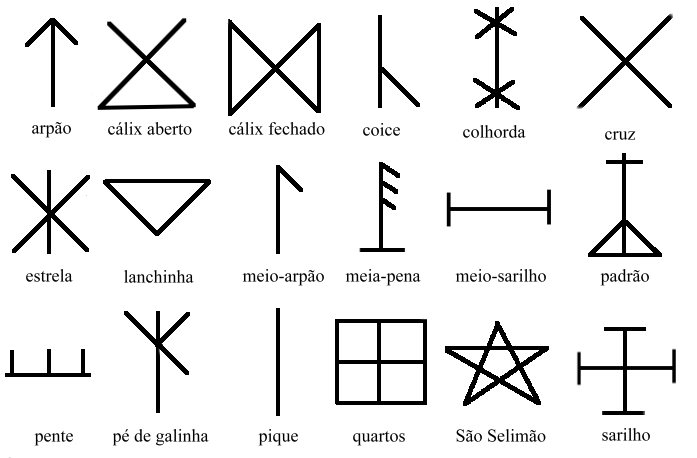
Siglas Poveiras that serve as a base to most used symbols.

The siglas poveiras have been used as family coat of arms since time immemorial by the community of Póvoa de Varzim. These symbols were used to distinctly mark personal and fishing belongings, serving as a form of property registration. The marca-brasão ("blazon-mark") of a family was well-known throughout the Póvoa de Varzim community. Children were identified within their family by the number of piques (similar to traces) incorporated into their marks.

The usefulness of this system is evident in its use by merchants in their credit books, where the siglas were read much like we read names written in the Latin alphabet today. Currency values were represented by rings and traces, which were added after an individual’s mark.

However, it was on the tombs of the deceased that the siglas poveiras gained a deeply personal significance. It became a common and accepted practice to have one’s mark carved onto their tombstone.

According to the Count of Vilas Boas, a former port authority of Leixões, an individual once stole a compass in Póvoa de Varzim and attempted to sell it in Matosinhos. Unaware that the "drawings" on the cover indicated the owner's name, the thief approached a woman from Póvoa de Varzim, who immediately recognized the mark. She alerted other fishermen, who also identified the mark, leading to the thief's apprehension and submission to the port authority.

=== Inheritance ===
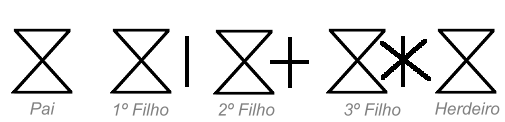
An example of hereditary siglas poveiras in a family of four children - The position of the piques varies in each family.

The siglas poveiras are hereditary emblems, similar to tamgas or house marks, passed down from fathers to sons. Each sigla has a unique symbolism, and only the heirs are permitted to use them.

The siglas poveiras were not merely invented but passed down through generations. The base family sigla was traditionally passed from the father to the youngest son, as Póvoa de Varzim's custom designates the youngest son as the family's heir. The other children received the sigla modified with traces, called piques. For example, the eldest son would have one pique, the second two, and so on, while the youngest son inherited the original sigla, sharing the same symbol as his father.

Analyses were conducted to determine whether families had consistently used the same symbols across generations, in light of some supposed inconsistencies within certain families. It became clear that these inconsistencies had historical or genealogical reasons, and that the symbols were indeed inherited through generations, preserved as part of Póvoa's local traditions. Hundreds of different marks were studied, leading to the identification of 84 distinct original families.

== Magical-religious marks ==
=== Chapels in beaches and hills ===
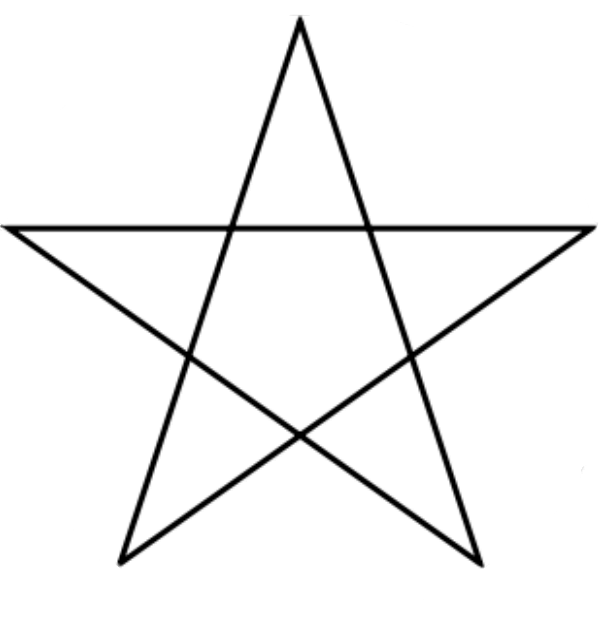
Only very rarely did siglas have magical value or were used as religious symbols. The sanselimão sigla was used as a protective symbol.

Important locations for the study of siglas poveiras include churches and religious sites not only in the city and its rural surroundings but also across the entire Northwest Iberian Peninsula, particularly in the Minho region of Portugal and in Galicia.

Over generations, the Poveiros used to inscribe marks on the doors of chapels near beaches or hills, either as journey markers or as "campaign promises" (promessas de campanha). This practice has been observed at Nossa Senhora da Bonança, at Esposende Beach and at Santa Trega on A Guarda Hill in Galicia. The inscription would serve as a marker for future Poveiros, indicating either the passage of the inscriber or an attempt to seek good luck from the local venerated saint.

On 23 September 1991, a sculpture honoring the siglas poveiras was inaugurated at the festival of Santa Trega in Northwestern Spain, commemorating the lost door of the Chapel of Santa Trega, which is known to have been covered with siglas poveiras. Following the inauguration, a fishing expedition aboard the Lancha Poveira Fé em Deus (Faith in God) arrived from Póvoa de Varzim. The fishermen aboard then ascended to Santa Trega and prayed at the chapel dedicated to the patron saint of the hill. Hills near the coast, visible from the sea, have always held significance in Poveiros traditions. Long ago, members of the fishing community would climb this hill to pray to the saint, performing a ritual with chants aimed at changing the direction of the winds to ensure a safe return home.

Siglas used in much the same way can be found in the churches of Senhora da Abadia and São Bento da Porta Aberta in Terras de Bouro, São Torcato in Guimarães, Senhora da Guia, and Vila do Conde. In the municipality of Póvoa de Varzim, they can also be found in the Chapel of Santa Cruz de Balasar.

=== Divisas ===
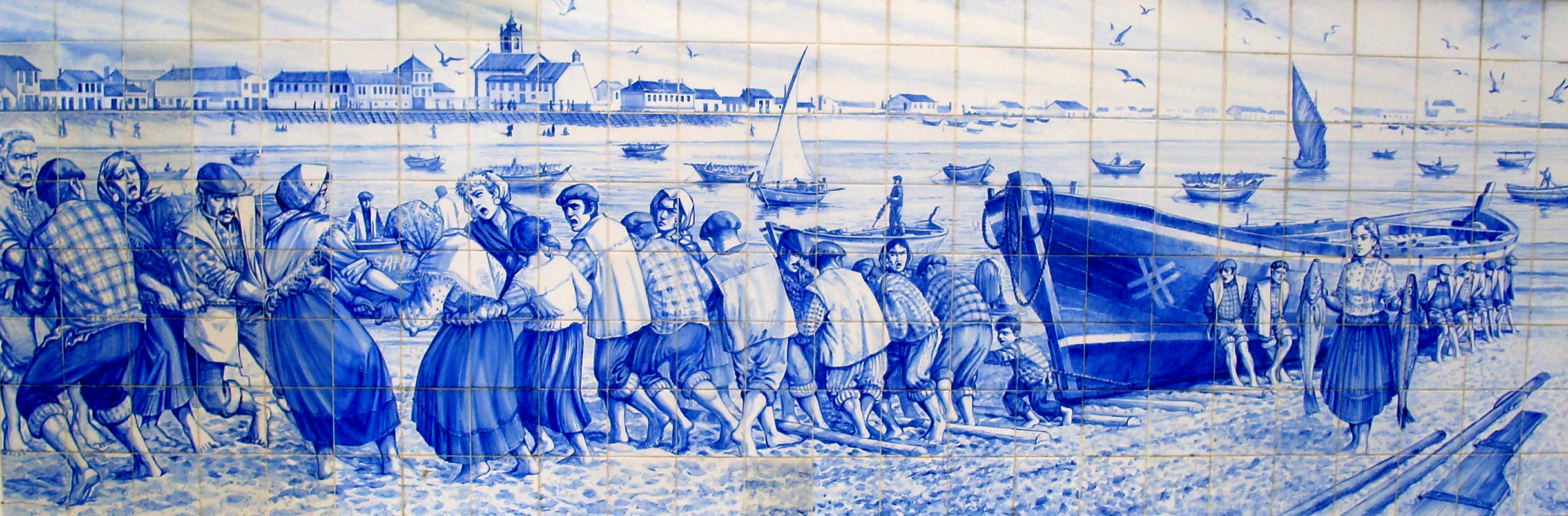
Representation of Siglas Poveiras in an Azulejo. The picture represents "Ala-arriba!", pushing a boat to the beach by the community.

The fish caught in a boat's net belonged to its owner, regardless of their position within the Lanchão or Sardinheiro castes. The fish were marked with the sigla and then delivered to the owner of the fishing net. These fish marks typically consist of blows made in the form of a sigla in different parts of the fish.

The crew of each boat also had a sigla, which was used by all members of the crew. If a worker moved to another boat, he would have to adopt the sigla of the new boat. These boat marks were known as divisas.

The divisas are true "coat of arms" intended for the recognition of the boat. However, they were different from the boat owner's mark. All Poveiro belongings were marked with the owner's personal sigla, except for the boat. This suggests that boats were predominantly subject to magical-religious invocations, often adopting a protecting saint, thereby acquiring a mythical character and being surrounded by protective symbols.

A. Santos Graça, Epopeia dos Humildes, pag. 146

Cinco dias depois, entrava na barra da Póvoa, uma lancha encarnada que, pelas suas divisas, sarilho, peixe e panal à proa, panal e quatro piques em cruz à ré, se reconheceu ser a lendária lancha Santa Philomena.
Vinha finalmente, descansar de tanta luta e fadiga na acolhedora praia da terra-mãe

English translation

Five days later, entered in Póvoa's sandbank, a reddish boat that, by its divisas, sarilho, peixe and panal at bow, panal and four piques in cruz at stern, was recognized as being the legendary Saint Philomena boat.
Finally, it returned to rest, after much fight and fatigue, in the cosy beach of her mother-land.

=== Marriage marks ===
The Poveiros wrote their sigla on the table of the mother church upon marriage as a way of recording the event. This use of siglas can still be found in the Igreja Matriz of Póvoa de Varzim (the mother church since 1757) and in the Igreja da Lapa.

A table in the old Church of Misericórdia, which served as the mother church until 1757, contained thousands of siglas. The collection of these siglas would have greatly contributed to a deeper study of the siglas poveiras, but they were destroyed when the church was demolished.

== Origins ==
The siglas were first studied by António de Santos Graça in his book Epopeia dos Humildes ("The Odyssey of the Humble"). Published in 1952, the book features hundreds of siglas and explores the history and maritime tragedy of Póvoa. Other works by him include O Poveiro (The Poveiro, 1932), A Crença do Poveiro nas Almas Penadas (Poveiro Beliefs Regarding Dead Souls, 1933), and Inscrições Tumulares por Siglas (Tomb Inscriptions Using Siglas, 1942).

Although there are various opinions regarding their origin, it is generally accepted that the siglas, also known as marcas, are of Scandinavian origin. Based on numerous similarities initially found at the Nationalmuseet in Copenhagen, Octávio Lixa Filgueiras identified several objects marked with "home-marks" from Funen (also known as Fyn) in Denmark. Further studies revealed that the complex hereditary marking system of Póvoa de Varzim was also present in Fyn. Given the geographical distance, historical Viking incursions along the Portuguese coast, and pagan rituals practiced by people from this particular fishing region, it is believed that there is a partial Norse ancestry and cultural legacy.

The development of the siglas or marcas (Bomärken) is at least partly attributed to the Norsemen who settled in the town during the 10th and 11th centuries. This form of primitive writing, which developed within the community of Póvoa de Varzim, was preserved due to the practice of endogamy. Additionally, the similarity between the marcas and the Scandinavian tradition of using specific bomärken ("homestead marks") for signatures and marking property is noteworthy.

Each base sigla has a name, typically related to daily objects. However, this sigla-object association occurred at a later date for both Póvoa de Varzim and the system studied in the Danish region of Funen. The hourglass of Funen was drawn in the same way as the chalice of Póvoa de Varzim, indicating that both are remnants of a later era.

Siglas have also been compared to runes, especially in the 1960s when Lixa Filgueiras called for further studies on the matter.

Comparing only identical Nordic runes:

pique - i-rune isaz (ice)
arpão (harpoon) - t-rune Tiwaz (Tyr)
meio-arpão (half-harpoon) l-rune laguz (lake)
cálix fechado (closed Chalice) - d-rune dagaz (day)
cruz (cross) g-rune gyfu (gift)

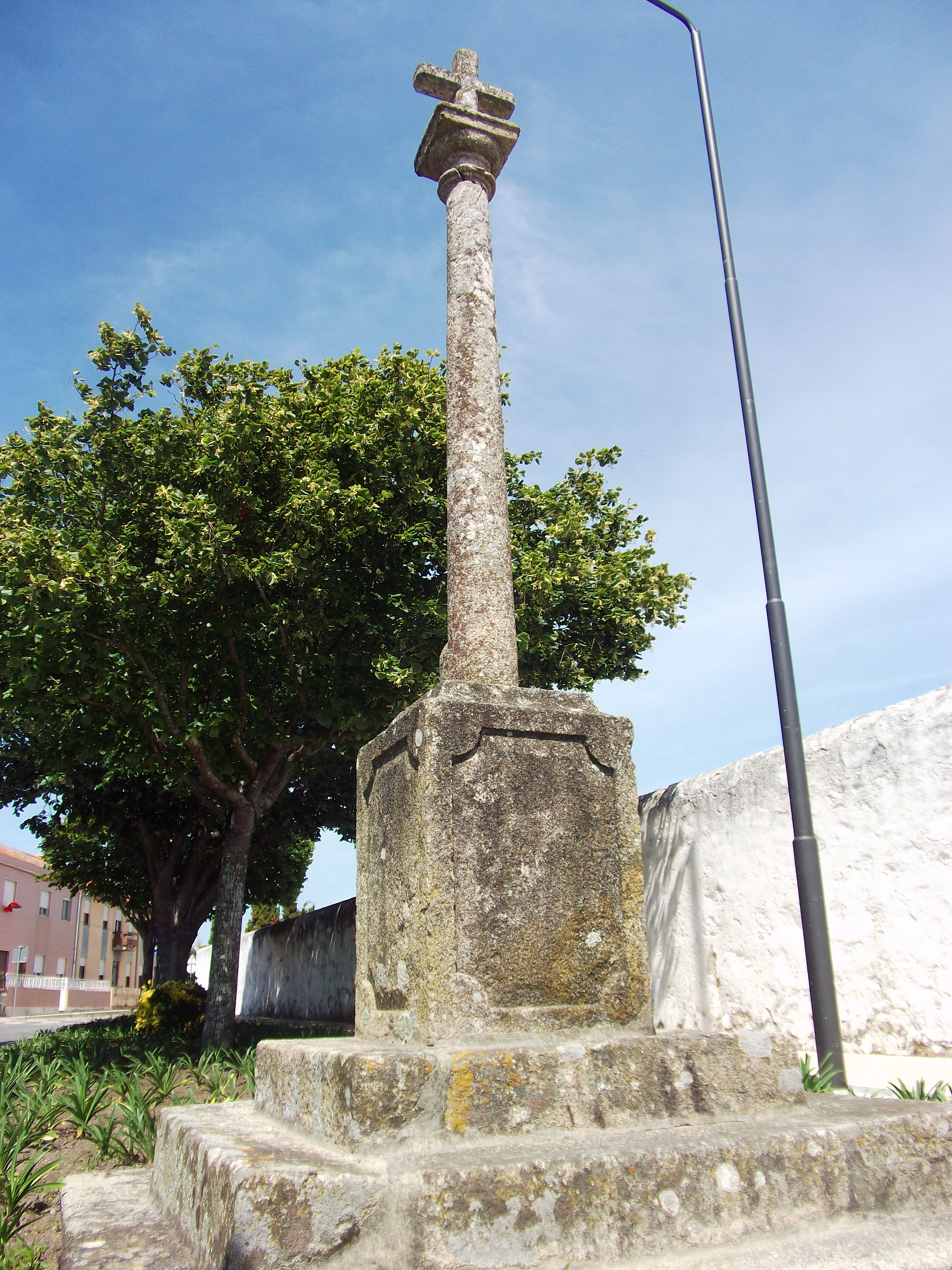
According to Santos Graça, the Cruzeiro of the Cemetery of Póvoa de Varzim (a cross in a stone column) was the origin of the sigla poveira known as Padrão (standard).

According to Santos Graça, the siglas were inspired by the daily objects of the residents of Póvoa de Varzim:

lanchinha — Poveiro Boat (port)
lanchinha — Poveiro Boat (nose)
mastro e verga — Barco Poveiro with hoisted sail
coice — Barco Poveiro (an area where women pushed for Ala-Arriba)
padrão — Cruzeiro of the Cemetery of Póvoa de Varzim
grades de dois e três piques — Gratings (Agricultural object used in the smoothing of the farm fields after harvest in Giesteira, Póvoa de Varzim)
sarilho and meio sarilho — Sarilho (object used by women to make hanks of wool or hemp in Póvoa de Varzim)

== Current use of Siglas ==
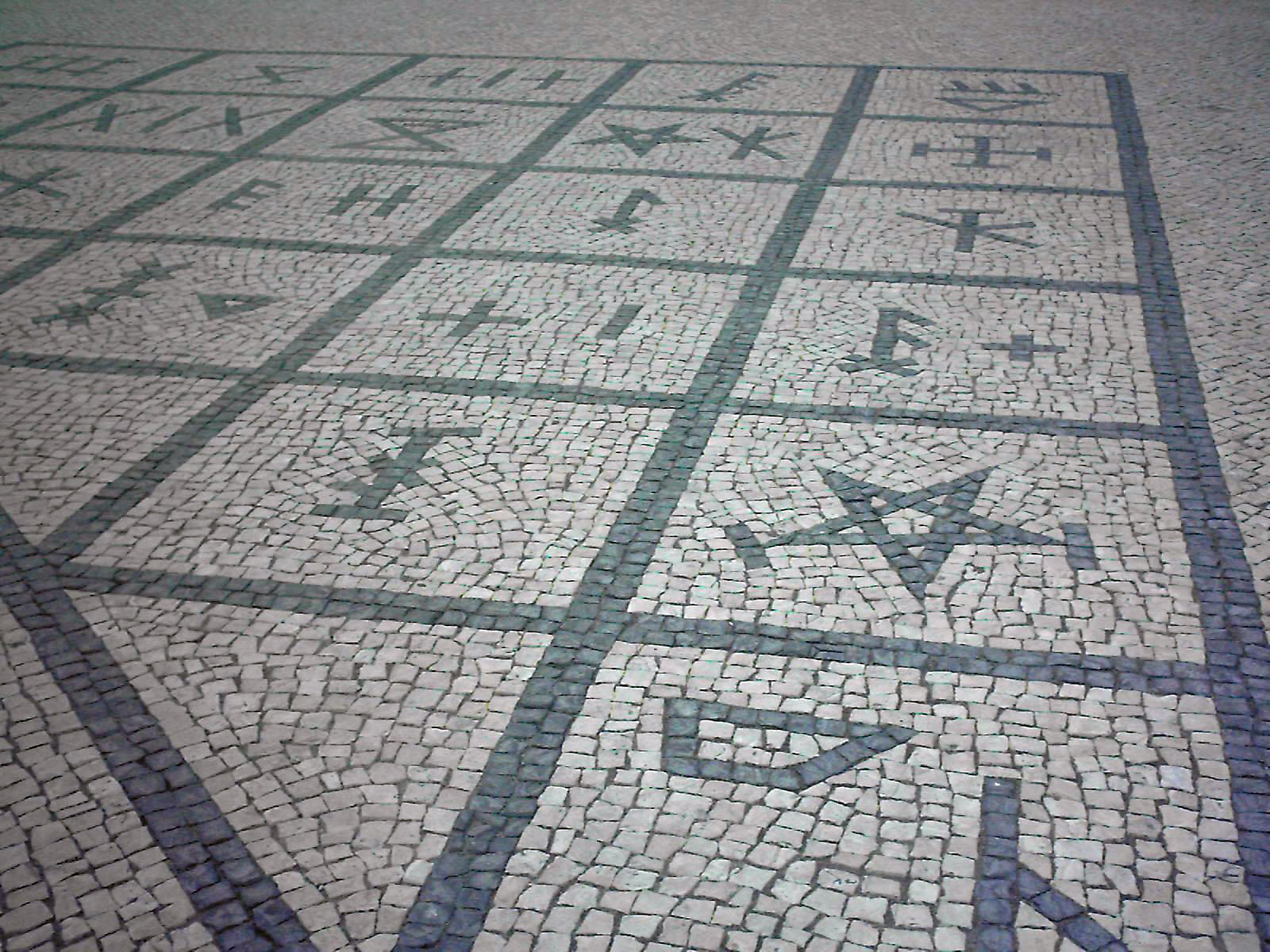
Traditional Portuguese pavement in Póvoa de Varzim city center with family marks.

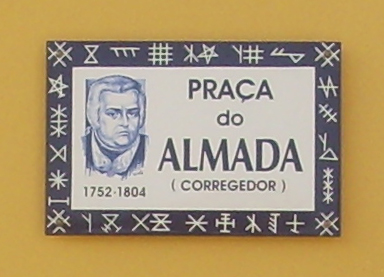
Street plate in Póvoa de Varzim city center with Povoan family marks.

The use of the Latin alphabet to identify boats occurred only very recently in Póvoa de Varzim, especially when compared to other fishing communities that used various marks. In 1944, of a set of 25 boat marks, only one used the Latin alphabet: F.A. de Francisco Fogateira, which replaced the marks lanchinha and the "double of two piques in cross and coice." In Aver-o-Mar, out of a group of 38 boats, eight vessels already used the alphabet and marks.

Despite the decline in use over the years, the banheiros of the Bairro Norte district still place their family marks on their belongings at the beach. The same practice occurs in their homes, where the marks are written on personal items. The Casa dos Pescadores da Póvoa de Varzim, the fishermen's association, still recognizes marks as valid forms of signature. Additionally, marks are used to decorate the city, such as in the pavements. Street signs in the city center of Póvoa de Varzim feature these marks to revive their use and reinforce local identity by showcasing the marks of traditional Povoan families.

== See also ==
- Pseudo-runes
