= Thrall =

Slaves in Viking society

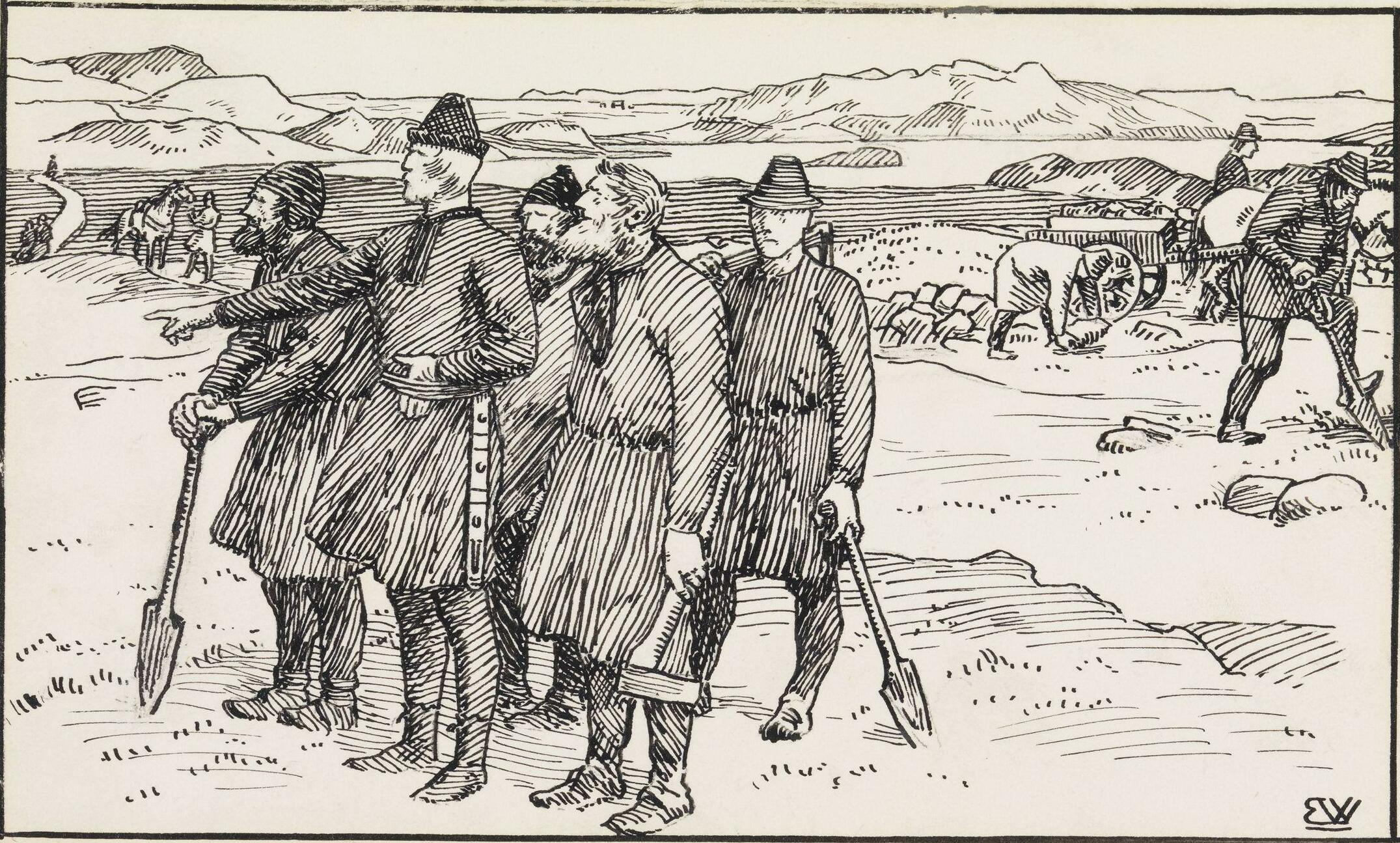
Erling Skjalgsson sets his thralls to day-work (Erik Werenskiold, 1899)

A thrall (/θrɔːl/) was a slave or serf in Scandinavian lands during the Viking Age. The status of slave (þræll, þēow) contrasts with that of the freeman (karl, ceorl) and the nobleman (jarl, eorl).

== Etymology ==
Thrall is from the Old Norse þræll, meaning a person who is in bondage or serfdom. The Old Norse term was lent into late Old English, as þræl. The term is from a Common Germanic þragilaz ("runner", from a root þreh- "to run"). Old High German had a cognate, dregil, meaning "servant, runner". The English derivation thraldom is of High Medieval date. The verb "to enthrall" is of Early Modern origin (metaphorical use from the 1570s, literal use from 1610).

The corresponding term in Old English was þeow (from Proto-Germanic þewaz, perhaps from a PIE root tekʷ-, "to run"). A related Old English term is esne "labourer, hireling" (from Germanic asniz, cognate with Gothic asneis "hireling", a derivation from asunz "reward", from the same root as English earn).

The term was borrowed into Irish as thráill, where it is used interchangeably with sclábhaí which is a cognate of the English slave (likewise for Slav is disputed).

Thrall was known by similar words in other old languages (Old Norse: þræll, Icelandic: þræll, Faroese: trælur, Norwegian: trell, træl, Danish: træl, Swedish: träl). The Middle Latin rendition of the term in early Germanic law is servus.

== Early Germanic law ==
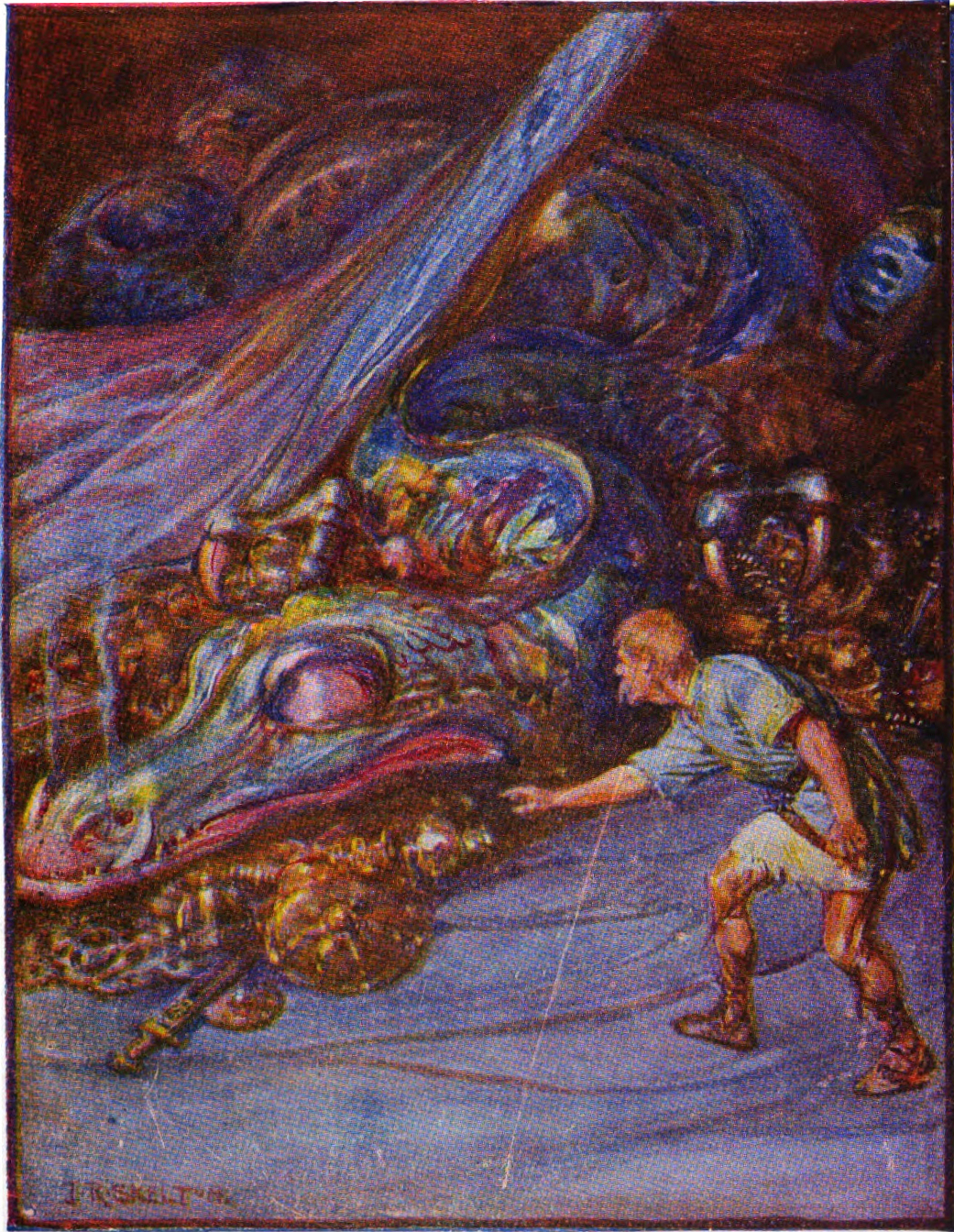
Beowulf's thrall steals the golden cup from the dragon (Joseph Ratcliffe Skelton, 1908)

The thrall represents the lowest of the three-tiered social order of the Germanic peoples, noblemen, freemen, and slaves; in Old Norse jarl, karl, and þræll (cf. Rígsþula); in Old English corresponding to eorl, ceorl, and þēow; in Old Frisian etheling, friling, and lēt, etc.

The division is of importance in the Germanic law codes, which make special provisions for slaves, who were property and could be bought and sold, but also enjoyed some degree of protection under the law.

The death of a freeman was compensated by a weregild, usually calculated at 200 solidi (shillings) for a freeman, whereas the death of a slave was treated as loss of property to his owner and compensated depending on the value of the worker.

== Thrall slave trade ==
A person could be made a thrall in different ways. It was a status that could be inherited from thrall parents. A freeborn could become a thrall voluntarily, or be sentenced to become a thrall as punishment for a crime (for life or for a limited time). A freeborn person could choose to make themselves a thrall because of poverty or debt; this process was called Flatföring.

Finally, a person could become a thrall when they were taken prisoner during warfare. War captives were commonly ransomed by their own family or community, but in the case a war captive was not ransomed, they were viewed as legitimate targets for enslavement. This would have been the original source for slaves in the Nordic countries, during warfare between local tribes and chiefdoms in Scandinavia, before the local chiefdoms were united to become kingdoms. After the unification of the Nordic countries, local warfare became more rare and slaves were now taken during warfare in foreign lands of the Nordic countries, and slave raids were to become one of the most important purposes of the Viking raids.

People taken captive during the Viking raids across Europe could be sold to Moorish Spain via the Dublin slave trade or transported to Hedeby or Brännö and from there via the Volga trade route to present day Russia, where slaves and furs were sold to Muslim merchants in exchange for Arab silver dirham and silk, which have been found in Birka, Wollin and Dublin; initially this trade route between Europe and the Abbasid Caliphate passed via the Khazar Kaghanate, but from the early 10th-century onward it went via Volga Bulgaria and from there by caravan to Khwarazm, to the Samanid slave market in Central Asia and finally via Iran to slavery in the Abbasid Caliphate.

The Vikings trafficked the slaves they captured for slave markets both in Christian Europe in the West as well as to Muslim slave markets in the East. The slave trade to Christian Europe went via both Pagan and Christian middlemen via the Elbe river Southward via Verdun, Koblenz and Arles toward the Mediterranean. Christian Europe disliked trade with Christian slaves, and the Vikings foremost trafficked captive Pagans during this route.

The slave route to the Islamic countries in the East were however more important for the Viking economy. The Vikings trafficked European slaves captured in Viking raids in Europe in the East in two destinations from present day Russia via the Volga trade route; one to Slavery in the Abbasid Caliphate in the Middle East via the Caspian Sea, the Samanid slave trade and Iran; and one to the Byzantine Empire and the Mediterranean via Dnieper and the Black Sea slave trade. Until the 9th century, the Vikings trafficked Baltic and Finnic European slaves from the Baltic Sea in the Northeastern Europe via the Wisla or the Donau rivers South East through Europe to the Black Sea. The Viking slave route was redirected in the 9th century, and until the 11th century the Vikings trafficked European slaves from the Baltic Sea via Ladoga, Novgorod and the Msta river via the Route from the Varangians to the Greeks to the Byzantine Empire via the Black Sea slave trade, or to the Abbasid Caliphate via the Caspian Sea (and the Bukhara slave trade) via the Volga trade route.

Archbishop Rimbert of Bremen (d. 888) reported that he witnessed a "large throng of captured Christians being hauled away" in the Viking port of Hedeby in Denmark, one of whom was a woman who sang psalms to identify herself as a Christian nun, and who the bishop was able to free by exchanging his horse for her freedom.

This trade was the source of the Arab dirham silver hoards found in Scandinavia and functioned from at least 786 until 1009, when such coins have been found there, and it would have been so lucrative that it contributed to the continuing Viking raids across Eastern Europe, which was used by the Vikings as a slave supply source for this trade with the Islamic world. Among such hoards can be mentioned the Spillings Hoard and the Sundveda Hoard.

== Society ==
=== Conditions and rights ===
Thralls were the lowest class of workers in Scandinavian society. They were Europeans who were enslaved by being prisoners of war, incurring debt or being born into the class via their parents. The living conditions of thralls in Scandinavia varied depending on the master. The thrall trade as the prize of plunder was a key part of the Viking economy. While there are some estimates of as many as thirty slaves per household, most families owned only one or two slaves.

In 1043, Hallvard Vebjørnsson, the son of a local nobleman in the district of greater Lier, was killed while he was trying to defend a thrall woman from men who accused her of theft. The Church strongly approved of his action, recognised him as a martyr and canonized him as Saint Hallvard, the patron saint of Oslo.

Despite the existence of a caste system, thralls could experience a level of social fluidity. They could be freed by their masters at any time, be freed in a will or even buy their own freedom. Once a thrall man was freed, he became a "freedman", or leysingi, a member of an intermediary group between slaves and freemen. He still owed allegiance to his former master and had to vote according to his former master's wishes. It took at least two generations for freedmen to lose the allegiance to their former masters and become full freemen. If a freedman had no descendants, his former master inherited his land and property.

While thralls and freedmen did not have much economic or political power in Scandinavia, they were still given a wergeld, or a man's price: there was a monetary penalty for unlawfully killing a slave.

Most of the thralls taken by the vikings were sold on the international slave market. Of those kept by Norse masters, male thralls were often tasked to tend to chattel and animals, to be fishermen or work in the forests; and female thralls cooked, milked cows (or in a minority of cases were kept as concubines); both male and female thralls can be assumed to work in agriculture and tend to the harder farm labor, such as constructing chattel fences.

A Bryte was a (normally male) thrall who was appointed trustee or governor of a farm owned by an absent landowner. A Fostre (male) or Fostra (female) was a privileged thrall, whose status has been interpreted as born and raised among the children of the owner rather than purchased; such thralls could only be legally sold in front of witnesses, they could marry free men or women and in that case their children would be born free; and male fostre could serve alongside free men in the ledung. The Fostre or fostra could be appointed to serve as the bryte or governor of a farm for an absent owner, and even as the guardian of free child; in some county laws such as in Västmanland, a widow could not remarry and settle in the home of her husband without appointing a male fostre or female fostra to manage the farm she inherited from her late husband.

It was in the interest of the owner to keep their thralls physically healthy. Many masters gave their thralls an opportunity to buy their freedom with labor. Erling Skjalgsson, for example, mandated a particular amount of work from his thralls, and let them keep the earnings of any additional work; he gave them land to cultivate their own crops to keep or sell, and gave each of his thralls a set worth and ransom, which made it possible for them to buy their freedom after a year or two, after having earned money enough to pay their price. He used their ransom money to buy their replacement, and helped his former thralls to establish their own support as fishermen or found their own farm.

=== End of slavery ===
The era of Viking raids resulting in the capture of slaves gradually ended in the 11th century. In the following centuries, more thralls obtained their freedom, either by purchasing it or on the initiative of their masters, the Church or the secular authority.

On Iceland, slavery was allowed in the Gray Goose Laws, which applied until 1270, but the law text Kristinna laga þáttur from 1122-1133 is the last time slavery is mentioned to have existed, and no existing slaves are mentioned anywhere from the late 12th century. In Denmark, slavery was phased out during the 12th century, likely from economic reasons and influence from Christian anti-slavery rhetoric. Existing slaves were last mentioned in the will of Bishop Absalom from 1201, in which he manumitted a couple of his existing slaves, and in a letter between the Pope and Anders Suneson, which mention the slaves of Suneson; after the early 13th century however slaves were no longer mentioned in Denmark, and the law text Jyske lov from 1241 has no mention of any slavery in existence in Denmark.

In Norway, slavery appears to have been phased out from the late 12th century onward, when existing law text dealt more with the status of former thralls than existing thralls, until no slavery was longer recognized to exist in the Magnus Lagabøtes landslov of 1274. The reason for the end of slavery appears to have been: a change in economy, which made it more profitable for big landowners to rent their lands to free farmers than to work it themselves, in combination with the Christian anti slavery rhetoric against Christians having other Christians as slaves, which made it more difficult to acquire slaves, as they had to be non-Christian in a now almost totally Christian Europe. In Sweden, slavery was phased out during the course of the 13th century, banned in one county after another, and finally abolished in the last remaining county in 1335.

== See also ==
- Danish slave trade
- Swedish slave trade
