= Molnby Hoard =

Viking silver hoard

Coordinates: 59.56790°N 18.09418°E

Molnby Hoard is a Viking Age deposit of 163 silver coins found in Molnby, Vallentuna Municipality in Sweden in October 2016. Most of the coins come from the area around Samarkand in Central Asia and date from the 10th century. The hoard is one of the largest Viking Age hoards to have been discovered in the province of Uppland.

== Discovery ==
The deposit of silver coins was discovered by archaeologist Elin Säll in a Bronze Age grave field which was being examined as part of plans for construction of a train depot for the narrow gauge railway Roslagsbanan in the area. The archaeologists published its findings approximately one month after the discovery of the coins. After the coins were extracted from the ground, they were handed over to specialists for conservation, as they began to decay immediately when they came into contact with oxygen. After treatment they are meant to be displayed at the Royal Coin Cabinet in Stockholm. The silver deposit is one of the largest Viking Age hoards found in the province of Uppland.

== Description ==
The hoard consists of 163 silver coins, of which 113 are clipped and 50 are untouched. Several of the coins have holes for strings made in them, so that they could be worn as jewelry; while the coins in their place of origin had a set monetary value, Scandinavia at the time lacked a monetary system and coins were coveted simply for the value of their metal and often converted into jewelry. The total weight of the hoard is 285 grams (10.1 oz). The coins carry inscriptions in Arabic and most of them were minted in the area around Samarkand, in what is today Uzbekistan and Iran. A few of the coins are imitations of Arabic coins made in present-day Russia somewhere along the river Volga. The youngest coin dates from CE 935 or 936; the hoard was probably buried in the middle of the 10th century.

== Analysis ==
Archaeologists calculate that the value of the hoard was equivalent of the worth of approximately ten cows or one and a half horse. It indicates that the owner of the hoard may have been a reasonably prosperous farmer. Why the hoard was buried in a Bronze Age grave field is unclear. Older burial sites continued to be venerated long after their origins had been forgotten. They were also occasionally used as boundary markers for land owners. Traditionally it has been believed that Viking Age hoards were deposited in times of danger or war. In the case of the Molnby Hoard there are however no signs of violence in connection to the hoard. The silver deposit may also have been buried for use in the afterlife. Such burials of items are known from the Sagas of Icelanders.

== See also ==
- Hörningsholm Hoard
- Sundveda Hoard
