= Løsingssønn =

Son of a released slave (Norwegian)

Løsingssønn or Løysingssønn was the son of a released slave or trell; thus the first generation free man.

A Løsingssønn had the right to be penalized for some types of wrongdoing, rather than physical punishment. For a minor offense, the fine for a løsingssønn was 1 mark or the equivalent of 107.16 grams of silver in the 1100s.
