= Danish slave trade =

The Danish slave trade occurred separately in two different periods: the trade in European slaves during the Viking Age, from the 8th to the 10th century; and the Danish role in selling African slaves during the Atlantic slave trade, which commenced in 1733 and ended in 1807 when the abolition of slavery was announced. The location of the latter slave trade primarily occurred in the Danish West Indies (Saint Thomas, Saint Croix, and Saint John) where slaves were tasked with many different manual labour activities, primarily working on sugar plantations. The slave trade had many impacts that varied in their nature (economic and humanitarian), with some more severe than others. After many years of slavery in the Danish West Indies, Christian VII decided to abolish slave trading. While no law explicitly permitted slavery within the European part of Denmark–Norway, multiple bureaucratic and legal cases during the 18th century permitted slaveholding of some slaves on European soil.

The Viking Age was a period of widespread upheaval and disruption throughout the northern world. Viking raiders sought captives, many of whom were captured and held in camps where they were ransomed, exploited and enslaved. The Persian traveler Ibn Rustah described how Vikings, the Varangians or Rus, terrorized and enslaved the Slavs taken in their raids along the Volga River.

== Danish slave trade during the Viking Age ==
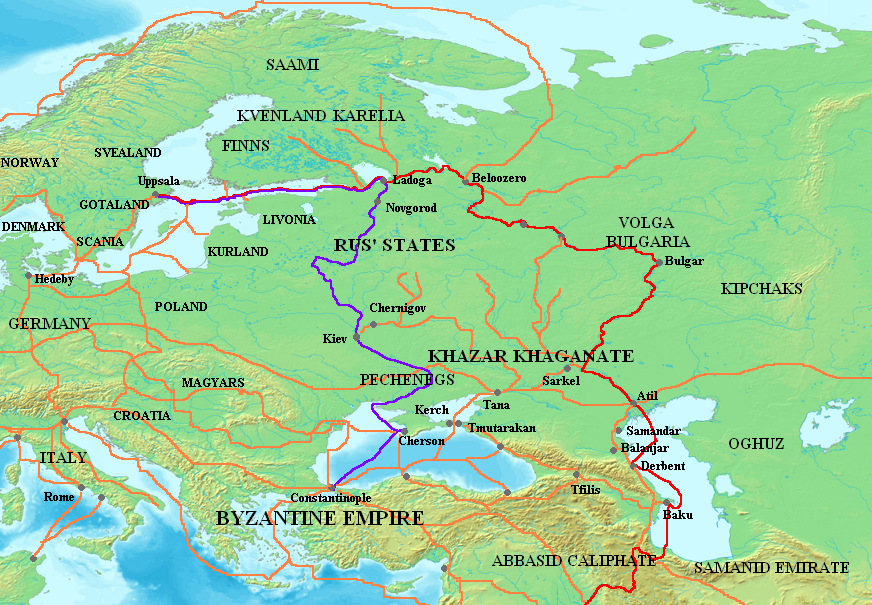
Map showing the major Varangian trade routes: the Volga trade route (in red) and the trade Route from the Varangians to the Greeks (in purple). Other trade routes of the eighth-eleventh centuries shown in orange.

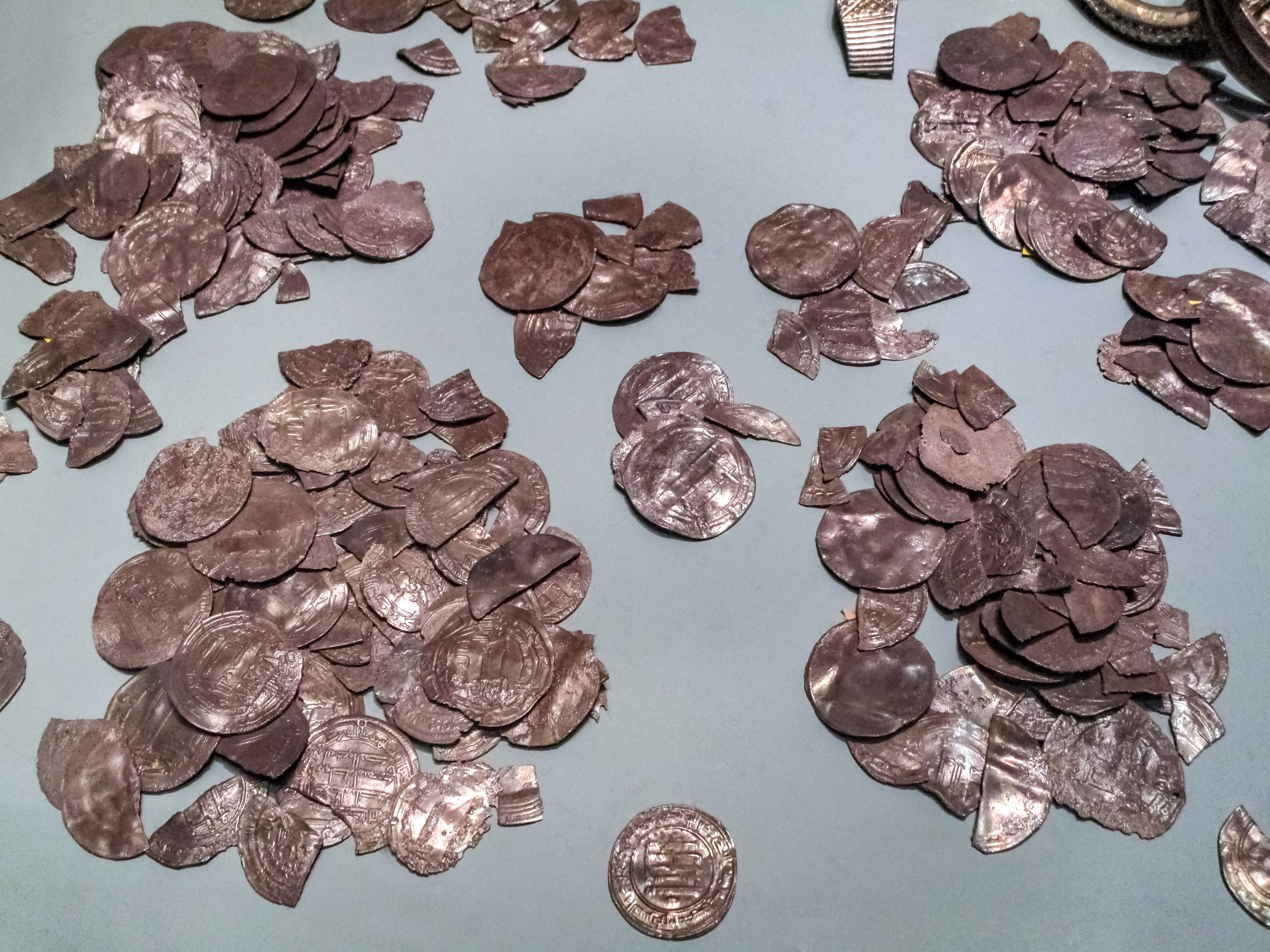
Samanid coins found in the Spillings Hoard.

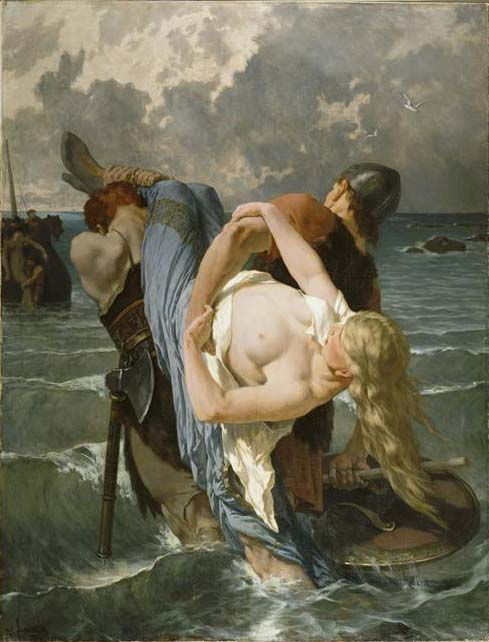
Vikings captured people during their raids in Europe.

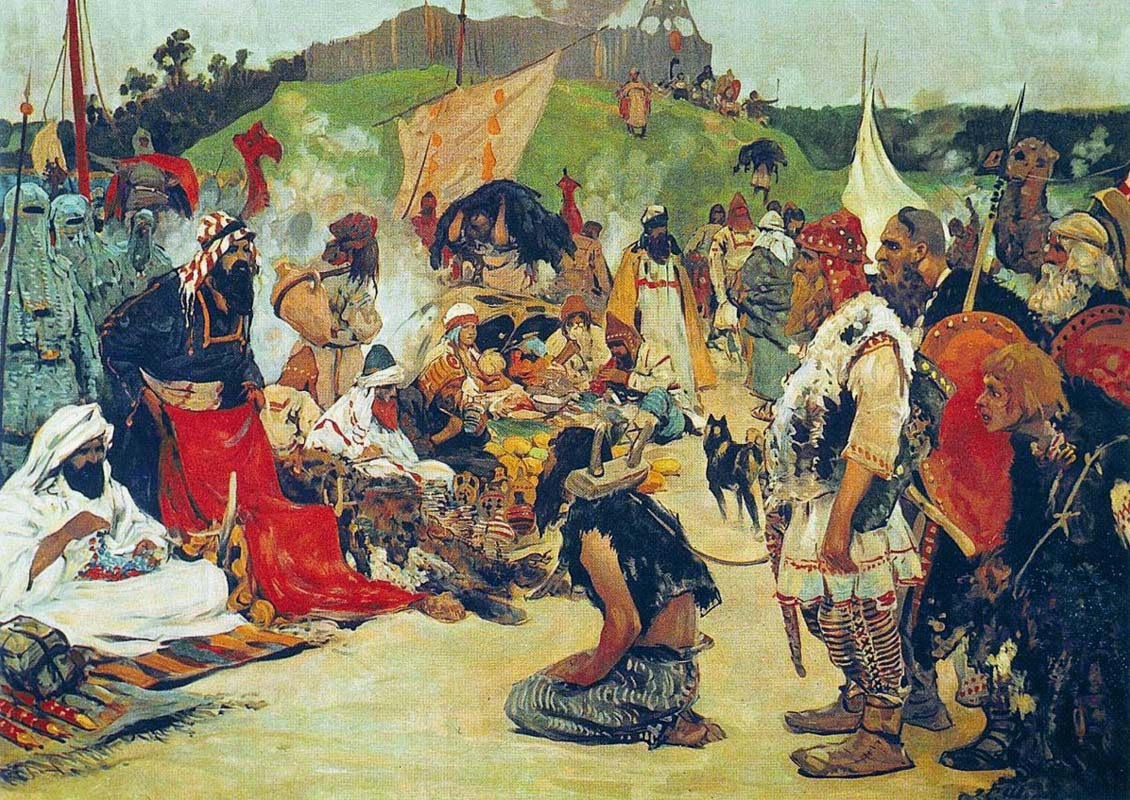
Trade negotiations in the country of Eastern Slavs. Pictures of Russian history. (1909). Vikings sold people they captured in Europe to Arab merchants in Russia.

Slavery was a deeply entrenched institution in Viking society which was hierarchical, and the lowest social class consisted of thralls and slaves, which made up the main source of hard labor in Norse society. This practice was largely abandoned once Denmark became Christian in the 10th century, but continued into the 14th century.

=== Background ===
Slavery was common in the Viking age period, and one of the main reasons for the Viking expansion was the search for slaves in other countries. One of the reasons Kievan Rus came to be was that Scandinavian settlers established themselves and traded with captured slaves. During the eighth to tenth centuries, slaves from Eastern Europe and the Baltic Sea were traded to elite households in Byzantium and the Islamic world via the Dnieper and Volga river systems, the Carolingian Empire and Venice. Arabic merchants from the Caspian Sea and Byzantine merchants from the Black Sea brought their goods to the trade markets in Rus, where they met the Viking traders and warriors known as Varangians, and traded their goods for the slaves captured by the Vikings in Europe.

The Vikings used the demand for slaves in the Southern slave markets in the Orthodox Byzantine Empire and the Islamic Middle Eastern Caliphate, both of whom craved slaves of a different religion than their own. During the Middle Ages, organized alongside religious principles, both Christians and Muslims banned the enslavement of people of their own faith, but both approved of the enslavement of people of a different faith; both did allow the enslavement of people they regarded to be heretics, which allowed Catholic Christians to enslave Orthodox Christians, and Sunni Muslims to enslave Shia Muslims. However, both Christians and Muslims approved of enslaving Pagans, who came to be a preferred target of the slave trade in the Middle Ages, and Pagan war captives were sold by Pagan enemies into the slave trade.

=== Viking slave trade ===
The Vikings trafficked European slaves captured in Viking raids in Europe in two destinations from present day Russia via the Volga trade route; one to Slavery in the Abbasid Caliphate in the Middle East via the Caspian Sea, the Samanid slave trade and Iran; and one to the Byzantine Empire and the Mediterranean via Dnieper and the Black Sea slave trade. Until the 9th century, the Vikings trafficked European slaves from the Baltic Sea in the North or the North Sea in the West via the Wisla or the Donau rivers southeast through Europe to the Black Sea. The Viking slave route was redirected in the 9th century, and until the 11th century the Vikings trafficked European slaves from the Baltic Sea via Ladoga, Novgorod and the Msta river via the Route from the Varangians to the Greeks to the Byzantine Empire via the Black Sea slave trade, or to the Abbasid Caliphate via the Caspian Sea (and the Bukhara slave trade) via the Volga trade route.

People taken captive during the Viking raids across Europe, such as Ireland, could be sold to Moorish Spain via the Dublin slave trade or transported to Hedeby or Brännö and from there via the Volga trade route to present day Russia, where Slavic slaves and furs were sold to Muslim merchants in exchange for Arab silver dirham and silk, which have been found in Birka, Wollin and Dublin; initially this trade route between Europe and the Abbasid Caliphate passed via the Khazar Khaganate, but from the early 10th century onward it went via Volga Bulgaria and from there by caravan to Khwarazm, to the Samanid slave market in Central Asia and finally via Iran to the Abbasid Caliphate.

Archbishop Rimbert of Bremen (died 888) reported that he witnessed a "large throng of captured Christians being hauled away" in the Viking port of Hedeby in Denmark, one of whom was a woman who sang psalms to identify herself as a Christian nun, and who the bishop was able to free by exchanging his horse for her freedom.

This trade was the source of the Arab dirham silver hoards found in Scandinavia and functioned from at least 786 until 1009, when such coins have been found there, and it would have been so lucrative that it contributed to the continuing Viking raids across Eastern Europe, which was used by the Vikings as a slave supply source for this trade with the Islamic world. Among such hoards can be mentioned the Spillings Hoard and the Sundveda Hoard.

One of the only accounts describing Norse slave practices in detail and first person is the Arabic merchant Ibn Fadlan meeting Volga Vikings. Describing Vikings using the Volga trade route using Saqaliba or Slavic slaves as translators when trading. There he describes the Norse ship burials only known in Norse society before the Viking expansion in 800 AD into present day Russia and Ukraine and that a slave girl was sacrificed to follow her master. Norse burials found in Sweden and Norway indicate that slaves were sacrificed in Sweden to follow their masters to the afterlife. However, Swedish archaeology shows that mostly male slaves were killed to follow their master into the afterlife and not females. Sacrificed female slaves have however been found sacrificed in Norway, where a woman found in the grave showed signs of having her throat slit in a similar manner to the execution described by Ibn Fadlan.

During the 11th century, the Viking nations of Denmark, Norway and Sweden became Christian, which made it impossible for them to continue to conduct slave raids toward Christian Europe and sell Christian Europeans to Islamic slave traders. The establishment of Kievan Rus likely also decreased the number of slaves taken in raids and limited it to the local market for slaves in Sweden, according to Lena Björkman. Slavery as such was gradually replaced by serfdom (Danish: hoveriet) in the 13th century.

=== Sites ===
Few sites remain that are directly linked to the Viking Age slavery, but the circular forts known as Trelleborge (Slave fortresses), have since 2023 been recognized as UNESCO World Heritage sites.

== Danish transatlantic slave trade ==
The involvement in the transatlantic slave trade began in the mid-1700s when they would transport African peoples to what was known then as The Gold Coast (located in the city of Accra in Ghana). Fort Christiansborg was the Danish fort that controlled the incomings and outgoings of slaves, the base in Ghana for the Danes.

=== Danish West Indies ===
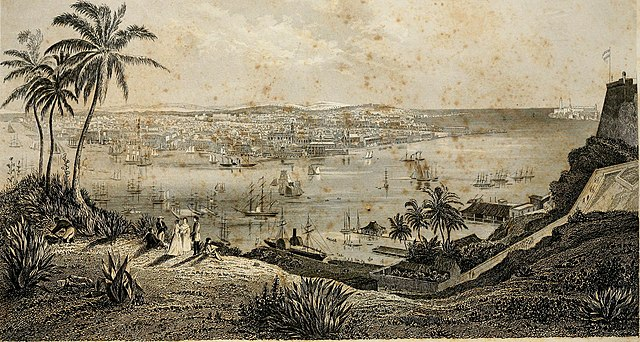
Depiction of landscape during Danish Slave Trade

Danish slave trade
- 1733–1807
- Location: Saint Croix, Saint Thomas, Saint John (Danish West Indies)
- Including: African slaves

The Danes had control over the Danish West Indies for around 250 years, from 1672 up until its sale to the U.S. in 1917. The Danish West Indies played a significant role in the Danish slave trade as this was the final destination for many of the slaves. The three islands that made up the Danish West Indies included Saint John, Saint Thomas, and Saint Croix.

Sugar, coffee, and tobacco were the primary resources that were cultivated on the islands as they all provided the Danes with significant returns. Plantation work was perceived as extremely demanding, especially for female slaves who were unable to maintain the high degree of manual labour that was required. The standard of living on the islands was very poor, with many slaves often catching fatal diseases or dying from exhaustion and malnutrition. A common misconception was that slaves were given enough food provisions weekly that would sustain them during their work. However, according to Martens (2016), these provisions were unsatisfactory and did not meet the minimum requirements to live healthily.

In 1915, negotiations between America and Denmark began over the sale of the three islands (Saint Thomas, Saint Croix, Saint John). The U.S. became increasingly concerned that Germany would make an attempt to acquire the islands and decided to act upon their instinct. Eventually, the U.S. bought the islands for US$25,000,000 of gold coin. The islands are now known as the U.S Virgin Islands.

=== Saint Thomas ===
Saint Thomas was the first island in the Danish West Indies that was used by the Danes for slave labour. It was the order of the then King Christian V to seize the island with the sole aim of acquiring the plantations on the island, which included primarily sugar and tobacco produce. A problem the Danish West India Company soon encountered was that convicts were terrible workers, and it was for this reason that they came to the realisation that colonists from neighbouring countries who had access to African slaves were much better suited to the nature of the work.

Before sugar plantations became the most popular crop, the Danish government established taphus. Taphus were essentially beer houses and halls that produced vast amounts of the alcohol to be transported overseas. However, the beer halls quickly became very unpopular with the Danish government as they attracted pirates to the islands, and also the economic benefit of producing beer was outweighed by the costs of building the infrastructure for the halls. In the early 1700s, sugar quickly became the most popular crop, with plantations scattered all over the island. With strict Danish government officials overseeing workers in St Thomas, slave traders would visit St. Thomas to purchase slaves as they were known to be good workers.

=== Saint John ===
One of the first locations where the Danes brought African slaves was Saint John. In 1717, 150 African slaves from Akwamu (now Ghana) were brought to the islands to work on the plantations. At the time, the island only cultivated cotton and tobacco. During the transition from Saint Thomas to Saint John, the Akwamu slaves all revolted against the owners of the plantations by taking over the property and deploying slaves from other African tribes to complete the work. Reasons for this revolt came from the introduction of harsh slave policies, new African slaves who would have rather died than be slaves, and a summer of natural disasters. However, by 1734, the plantation owners eventually regained control of the island. The primary reason for revolts such as these was due to the fact that owners did not reside on the island. Instead, they would rely upon overseers, who were known as “mesterknægte” ['master knaves'].

=== Saint Croix ===
In 1733, the Danish West Indies Company bought Saint Croix from the French government. A key attribute of Saint Croix was its independent government, which differentiated it to Saint Thomas and Saint John. Planters soon became frustrated with this and demanded the King of Denmark buy the company. As Saint Croix was the most lucrative island out of the three, the King decided that it should be the capital of the three islands. This meant the capital was to be moved from Saint Thomas to Saint Croix.

Saint Croix's wealth was heavily attributed to its production of sugar, but also rum. The other commodities it exported included cotton, molasses, and hard woods. By 1803, there was a total of 26,500 slaves on the island (the most out of the three), but as Denmark's role in the slave trade began to fade, this number reduced significantly.

=== Costa Rica ===
Two Danish slave ships, the Fridericus Quartus and Christianus Quintus were identified in 2025 as the shipwrecks found in Cahuita National Park on the Atlantic coast of Limón Province, Costa Rica. These ships carried cloth, metal goods, and weapons to trade for enslaved Africans. In 1710, after navigational errors, the ships struck reefs off what was then called Punta Carreto, one caught fire while the other lost its anchor. Both were abandoned, and from around 690 enslaved Africans, 100 were recaptured and sent to work in the nearby cacao plantations.

== Impacts of the slave trade ==
The Danish Slave trade had a range of impacts, ranging from humanitarian consequences to economic changes. Also, the severity of these impacts ranged massively as some were fatal and others purely menial consequences that arose as a result of a significant power imbalance.

=== Human impact ===
For the duration of the slave trade, it is estimated that over 100,000 African slaves were transported to the Danish West Indies, with approximately half of them dying due to the inhumane conditions. From 1733 (after the concept of New World Slavery was introduced), owners of the sugar plantations would threaten any slave that was abusive or disrespectful towards white people. For those who did not obey these orders, they were scored with red-hot iron tongs or even hung if the slave owner did not see the need for the slave.

=== Economic impact ===
A key motive for the Danish government to transport slaves to the West Indies was the potential economic gain. The production of sugar was a key objective for the Danes as it provided them with high returns from buyers and investors. Trading sugar with other nations for other commodities such as rice, rum and cotton meant that Denmark had a means of negotiation when purchasing commodities. On top of the significant returns produced by the sugar production, many Danish citizens were employed on the plantations, contributing to a low unemployment rate in Denmark at the time. Historians are still unsure as to the profitability companies actually made, yet it is estimated that the profit margins were around 2.58% annually.

== Slave trade abolition ==
In 1792, Christian VII announced that the slave trade in the Danish West Indies would be henceforth abolished. The announcement also declared that from 1803 onwards it was forbidden for Danish subjects to participate in the Atlantic slave trade. Historians have debated over the reason behind this decision, and have broadly settled on four main factors: the humanitarianism of Danish enslaver and politician Ernst Heinrich von Schimmelmann, the unprofitability of the Danish slave trade, reforms to slavery in the Danish West Indies and the desire to abolish the institution before Great Britain.

Unlike in Britain, where the British Parliament had been flooded with petitions requesting abolition, there was no major abolitionist movement in Denmark, and as an absolute monarchy slavery was never debated over in the Danish government. Denmark, unlike other European colonial powers, had also not experienced any slave rebellions in its colonies prior to Christian VII's announcement. The Danes were well aware of the ongoing British debates over abolition and knew that William Wilberforce had failed to abolish Britain's involvement in the Atlantic slave trade in May 1791, which potentially hastened Christian VII's decision in the next year.

== Denmark's apology ==
In 2017, foreign minister, Anders Samuelsen, apologised for the many years of torture and treatment of African slaves. In his apology to the Ghanaian president, Nana Akufo-Addo, Anders claimed "We share a dark history of slave trade – shameful and unforgivable part of Danish history. Nothing can justify the exploitation of men, women and children in which Denmark took part".

Many years before the apology, Denmark (through its DANIDA Agency) had been helping Ghana with both social and economic sectors, human rights, and good governance.

== See also ==
- Danish West Indies slavery
- Danish Africa Company
- Danish West India Company
- Danish Gold Coast
- Dane gun
- Fort Christiansborg
