= Dane gun =

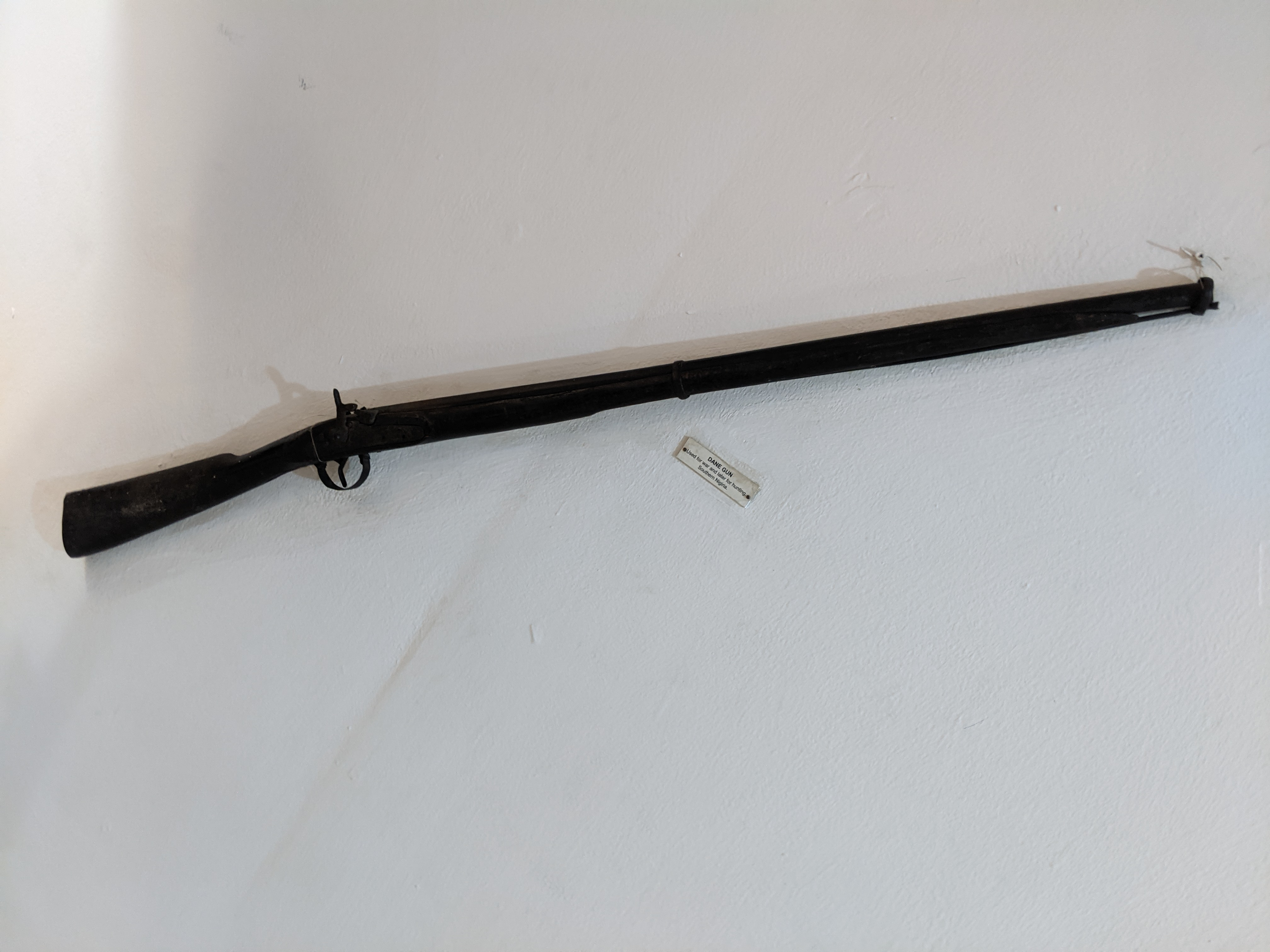
- Dane gun from Southern Nigeria
- Type: Percussion cap Musket

Specifications
- Action: Flintlock

The Dane gun was originally a type of long-barreled flintlock musket imported into West Africa by Dano-Norwegian traders prior to the mid-19th century. The term is now used chiefly by Europeans living along the west African coast to generally describe any indigenously made firearm of this type.

Local names for these firearms vary from language to language, but are generally something that "seem[s] to mean or imply a 'native gun'". They are produced in large numbers by local blacksmiths, and are used mostly for hunting game, replacing traditional weapons such as the bow and spear.

== See also ==
- Danish West India Company
- Osu Castle
- Danish slave trade
