= Leysingi =

Freed slave in Norse law

In Norse law, a leysingr (plural: leysingi) was a freed slave (a freed thrall). While often used interchangeably frjálsgjafar was the lowest rank of freedmen. frjálsgjafar was a person whose freedom was given but not made public. Once a frjálsgjafar gave a freedom ale he became a leysingi. A leysingi had more freedoms after giving a freedom ale and could have more freedoms by doing things such as other work or his master granting him more freedoms. A slave had to be adopted into free kin with such a status as freedman, but they still had lower status in society. In the law codes, a freedman was consistently regarded as inferior, whether they committed an offense or were the victim of one. A master had control over where the freedman lived, who he could marry. When a freedman got old, he relied on the church for care. The act of manumission had to be confirmed by an oath and announced publicly either at an assembly or in the church itself. The freedman could not even leave his master’s property without permission. If the slave had not given a freedom ale he could not earn over 1/3 eyrir. The children of the freedman could not inherit anything unless he was married to a freedwoman, and they had both given their freedom ale. These are just some ways in which a freedman had less rights. Slavery was eventually abolished in Scandinavian society. Each year the assembly had to give one slave his freedom, and slavery had disappeared in most Scandinavian countries by the 14th century.

A leysingi was much different than the modern conception of freedmen because they had limited freedom. Freedmen were still reliant on their master’s against their own freewill. Masters had control over marriage, business dealings and could not leave without permission. They essentially were still slaves but had slightly more freedom. For slavery itself, it was not necessarily a slave economy, it was more of a small-scale household-based form of slavery. These slaves were brought as prisoners, were traded for, or used to pay off debt rather than based on skin color.

A leysingi was also an old Norse nickname given to freedmen to identify them and this later evolved into the surname Leising. 638 people have the surname leysing in the United States as of 2010.

== Background ==
Slavery was most prevalent during the Viking Age. The Vikings were a group of people out of Scandinavia who raided, traded and created settlements throughout Europe. Slavery was an important part of their society. A Leysingi, which means freedman, is a term which can only be fully understood if there is context on the process in which a person becomes a slave and an understanding of Scandinavian society. There are various stages leading up to a freedman in Scandinavian society. It’s important to start with how one becomes a slave and who are the slaves in Scandinavian society, discussing the life of a slave and their daily life and tasks they would undergo, the social classes, and how slavery was ultimately ended within the society of Scandinavia and slaves were given freedom.

=== Social Classes ===
Social classes within Scandinavian society are complex. There are various sources of evidence but a common source that is cited is from the poem, Rígsþula (the Lay of Rig). It was written sometime between the 9th and 13th centuries. The poem talks about a god called rig, who visits three houses sleeping with the wife and fathering sons in each of the households. The third son was Jarl, who marries and fathers’ nobility and royalty. The second son is Karl, who marries and fathers the race of free men. The oldest son, Þræl, a slave, has children with a woman named Þír, who is a female slave, and has no benefit of a wedding. This poem highlights the three social classes in Viking society. The Jarl or nobility on the top, the Karl or Freemen, and the slave usually referred to as a Þræl or thrall. It shows what we know about the origins of social classes within Scandinavian society. It discusses the Þræl as having dark skin which some historians say could mean it is talking about a Celtic slave, but Karras argues its likely just talking of unattractiveness. It is worth noting there is debate among historians on the reliability of this poem because it doesn’t seem like any sagas or legal codes of this time in Scandinavian countries. It is proposed by some historians that because of the Irish element could indicate an origin within a Norse community in Ireland or Scotland.

=== Sagas ===
Egils saga discusses the Egil Skallagrímsson, a Viking poet, warrior, and farmer, during the 9th and 10th century. In this saga, it discusses a thrall named Grani who was owned by Steinar. He takes the cattle on the neighbor, thorstein’s land. This angers Thorstein and he kills Grani. Steinar sees a tall and strong slave named Thrand. He was worth a hefty sum. He was worth three marks of silver, which was twice the price of a common thrall. Steiner buys Thrand. He gives Thrand an axe and Thrand takes the cattle on Thorstein’s land and Thorstein kills Thrand. Steiner attempted to sue Thorstein for thrall-slaying and wanted outlawry as the penalty of each slaying. This was the law, when thralls of anyone were killed, the compensation for the thrall must be paid to the owner before the third sunrise. However, two charges of lesser outlawry equaled one charge of full outlawry. Thorstein did not file a countersuit for any of the charges. This shows the demeaning nature of slaves being seen as property in Norse society. It also shows the value of slaves in society. It gives a better insight into what would happen if someone were charged with killing another person’s slave. Heimskringla Saga was written by Snorri Sturluson in 1230 describes the various kings of Sweden and Norway and their lives. It also discusses the conflict between pagan and Christian people during this time. In Heimskringla, Slaves play a role as messengers. Jarl Hákon sends his slaves to a farmer named Ormr to bring his wife, Guðrún, to him. The slaves had dinner at Ormrs house and requested him to bring his wife to the Jarl. Ormr refused to bring Guðrún. Guðrún was insulted. She told the slaves to tell Jarl that she would not come unless one of his mistresses, Þóra of Rimull, came for her. The slaves told the farmer and his wife that they would regret their decision not to come with them and made threats to the farmer and his wife. This shows slaves could be used as messengers and enforce their masters demands. It also shows slaves were able to wield authority on their masters’ behalf.

=== Writings of Ibn Fadlan ===
Ibn Fadlan was a traveler from the 10th century. He has various run ins with the Vikings and gives an insight into the various items they traded which includes slaves. In one instance Ibn Fadlan explains the Vikings prayers. He explains the Vikings had a tall wooden pole with a face with many small images around it and they would bring their bread, meat, onions, milk and mead and say, “O my lord, I have come from a far country and have with me so many slave girls for such a price, and so many sable pelts. I have brought this offering to Thee. I wish that Thou shouldst provide me with a merchant who has many dinars and dirhams, and who would buy from me at the price I desire and will raise no objection to me to aught what I may say.” And then he departs and goes off to trading and if he has trouble trading that day then comes back and prays more. This gives insights on how various Viking tribes prayed and traded throughout Europe and the middle east and gives insight into what they traded which included many slaves. Slaves were also used as human sacrifice and showed off the wealth of the owner. Many slaves sacrificed were women and many sacrifices were to pagan gods, and of course with their owner when their owner was buried. Many slaves during this time, were currency and sacrifices to a pagan god.

Ibn Fadlan gives one of the few written accounts of Viking sacrifices. He describes his experience with a chieftain who had died and a slave girl who decides to be cremated with him. Two slave girls accompany her. She drinks happily and is cheerful to be cremated with the chieftain. They placed a couch on top of the chieftain’s ship and covered it with quilts, Byzantine silk brocade, and cushions. A crone arrived called the “Angel of Death” and spread the couch coverings. She is responsible for putting the chieftain in order and killing the slave girl. They laid the chieftain out on the cushions. They brought alcohol, fruits and herbs and placed it beside him. They brought bread, meat, onions, his weaponry and a dog which they sliced into two and placed it in front of him. They brought a rooster, hen, and two cows and they cut them into pieces and threw them on the ship. At the time of the evening prayer on Friday they brought the slave-girl to something they constructed which looked like a door-frame. She put her feet on the hands of the men and was raised above that door-frame. She said, “behold, I see my father and my mother” and they brought her down. Then they lifted her up a second time and she said, “behold, I see all of my dead kindred, seated”. They brought her down and then lifted her up a third time and she said, “behold, I see my master, seated in Paradise. Paradise is beautiful and verdant. He is accompanied by his men and his male-slaves. He summons me, so bring me to him” They next handed her a hen. She cut off its head and threw it away. They took the hen and threw it on board the ship. The slave girl removed all her jewelry and gave it to the “Angel of Death”, and she drinks. She eventually is dragged into the pavilion to be killed, and the Vikings bang their shields with sticks so the other slave girls could not hear her screams. Six men had intercourse with the slave girl and then they take a rope and place it around her neck and hold her hands and legs and stab the slave girl with a dagger. They placed the slave girl next to the chieftain and burned the ship. This took an hour for the ship to be burned to ash This shows the gruesome way slaves would be sacrificed in the Viking age and gives insight into the brutality of the Viking age

=== Becoming a Slave ===
The extent of the Viking slave trade is unclear, but modern scholars believe they had a vast slave trade. Evidence of Scandinavian exploration spread throughout various countries in Eastern and Western Europe England, Scotland, Ireland, France, the Low Countries, Germany, the Baltic coast, and Russia. They may have captured slaves in all these places. In Slavic lands, various Arab sources describe the Rus, who modern scholars believe are swedes. The Swedes went south along the Dniepr to Kiev, the Black Sea, and Byzantium. They went along the Volga to the lands of the Bulgars and the Khazars, dealing in furs, wax, amber, and slaves. Another important trading route was from Russia to Gotland. Due to the vast number of Durhams found in Gotland, Scholars believe swedes were selling Slavic slaves to the Muslims and brought their profits back to Gotland. There is no evidence Slavic slaves were ever brought back to Sweden in large numbers. Danish Vikings enslaved many people in Germany, France and England. Saints Willibrord, Anskar, and Rimbert, ransomed boys from the Danes, according to their biographers. They took other Danish Vikings as well as Norwegians as Slaves Norwegian Vikings raided the Irish and Scottish as well as the Norse people in Scotland, Ireland and even Norway. According to most literature, Norse people were rarely raided. The Vikings participated in major slave trades in various Islamic countries, Britain, Ireland and Spain. There were many slave markets in Scandinavia and is evidence of Irish slaves being on the western part of Scandinavia. Since Danes and Swedish Vikings traded foreign slaves, it is likely there were foreign slaves on the eastern half as well. After the Viking age, Slavery became more hereditary rather than foreign slaves. Some law codes suggest that any slave who is born to one or both parents who are unfree inherit their slavery. Law codes like the Frostatþing law and Gragas say if the mother is free and father is a slave then the child is free. In Danish and Swedish laws, it is likely that slaves had relatives who were free which indicates slaves could be people who were formerly free. The issue with later laws is the influence of Christianity made it much different than how it was during the Viking age. Various law codes in Scandinavia suggest that debt slavery prohibited or is temporary. Voluntary debt slavery existed for people who were poor, convicted of offenses and couldn’t pay the compensation. Other than foreign raids, trade, debt, and punishment, there were unwanted children who could be sold into slavery. From the evidence stated there were many various ways a person can become a slave but the most common were through capture, birth, or debt.

This all shows that the Vikings spread their way of life and culture to other lands. Making an impact on others that were not necessarily born nor raised on Viking cultures.

=== Life of a Slave ===
Many of what historians know about slaves, and the Leysingi comes from the Nordic laws. Many historians note that the slave worked with the master, and the Nordic idea and institution of slavery was different than modern slavery.

Iceland gives a good representation of the life of a slave Scandinavian society due to the amount of literary sources. Icelandic sagas describe farms as having several slaves and is a household based, where master, hired workers, and slaves all take part. There were various large estates containing 50-100 men, but this was not the norm. The slaves may have performed the less desirable jobs such as dunging the fields but their tasks in haymaking, woodcutting, herding, and hauling are like the jobs performed by free workers and even the masters. Female slaves other than concubines had similar jobs to other household women: weaving and grinding grain. Women could also be nurses or foster mothers. Women are portrayed less in the sagas than men which could indicate there were less women slaves because of female infanticide or selective raiding or purchase, but it could also be because of the authors choice to use male slaves rather than female. It is always good to remember Icelandic sagas were written hundreds of years after they say to have to happen so much of it may reflect the 13th century rather than the 9th or 10th centuries. The archeological evidence gives evidence that the Icelandic sagas may be correct on their interpretation of household size. For example, in the Viking age, there is evidence of only one dwelling. The evidence shows before and after the Viking age slavery seemed to have been a household phenomenon.

=== End of Slavery ===
It is difficult to put an official end to Scandinavian slavery, but scholars identify the end of slavery around the 13th century due to the law codes written at this time showing slavery being phased out. Christianity laid the groundwork for Slavery being abolished. The church encouraged manumission of slaves and ensured rights for the freed slaves. There is evidence the church encouraged the Uppland Law which improved slave's condition by recognizing slave marriage and preventing the sale of Christian slaves. Another reason is because slave owners didn’t have to pay certain taxes that came along with slavery like paying a tax to support the ship levy and having to pay for the slaves. Understanding the ways in which one becomes a slave such as through capture, birth, or debt. The small household and agricultural work a slave were to perform. The circumstances for freedom. The ending of slavery in Scandinavia because of the church and a move to tenant farming. The social classes of Scandinavian society. The writings of Ibn Fadlan. These are important in understanding the background for what a Leysingi is.

== Life as a Leysingi ==
A Leysingi was a freed slave in Nordic society in the Middle Ages during Viking rule. And a thrall was an “unfree” slave, both were tenants on their owner’s land. Their life was mostly decided by their title as such, if a person were unfree then they could become more of a currency and inheritance rather than a slave in Nordic society. Many of which were traded during raids or even passed down in a family (if the slave was still alive at the time of their owner’s passing). In this way slaves were seen as a commodity, able to be traded to other countries. The life of a leysingi was a lot different than slavery in the modern sense due to their extremely limited freedom. Their master’s still had a lot of control over them. They were not able to live off the farm or had very much freedom. They were viewed similar to slaves, even though they were freed and they shared many similarities to slaves such as not having many rights. And many stayed with their owner or were adopted into another owner’s land because they could not afford to live on their own or the law restricted it in the region in which they were staying

=== Life After Emancipation ===
The life of a leysingi had limited freedoms and was still subject to his master. A freedman who had not given their freedom ale could not manage his own business affairs or arrange his own marriage and even after had to get permission from his former master. They had to work for the master on the farm and could not leave without permission. Total dependence on their master was only necessary if they had not yet given their freedom ale. Their former master had the right to the inheritance over the former slave in Iceland and Norway. Freedmen who have not yet given their freedom ale, their master would be their heirs rather than their children. Freedmen could buy the right for their children to inherit. Even if the freedmen had given his freedom ale, the master still had some rights over the inheritance before more distant members of the freedman’s family. In Iceland, the master got the inheritance if they had no children. The master had responsibility for maintaining the freedman. In Norwegian law, once a master had given freedom to their slave they could not take it back and if the freedman fell into need the master was required to help him. In the Danish and Swedish laws, once the slaves were set free the master no longer was involved, but the freedman was adopted into a kin group rather than be subject to the former master. Freedman had a status somewhere between a slave and a free person. In Continental Germanic law freed people had an intermediate status between free person and slave. Under the Lombard law the complete emancipation ritual would make the slaves “folk-free,” under the codes of the visigoths the master could place limits on how much freedom the freedman could have. This shows the life of a freedman, and the control their master’s had over them in various countries in medieval Scandinavia based on the law codes. It also shows how freedmen compared to other countries in the medieval world. It is important to remember law codes may not have been followed exactly the way they are laid out. It is a good indicator of how things were supposed to work.

=== Sagas ===
The Laxdaela is a saga written in the 13th century which discusses the lives of various people in the Breiðafjörður region in the 9th to the 11th century. It discusses freedmen in the story “About Hoskulds Son.” Hrut, Herjolf’s son, gave a thrall named Hrolf, his freedom and with it money and a dwelling place where his people joined with Hoskuld’s. The freedman was settled down on land extremely close to Hoskuld. He gained much wealth. Hoskuld was offended that he placed the freedman right up against him and told the freedman to pay him money for the lands he lived on. The freedman went to Hrut and told him what happened. Hrut gave no money to Hoskuld because he didn’t know who the land belonged to. Thorleik, Huskulds son, went at the advice of his father and killed the freedman. He took all the money the freedman had made. When Hrut heard this, he was not happy Hrut got lawyers to see if there was any way he could get back at Hoskuld, but there was not because it was determined to be on Hoskulds land. This shows the life of a freedman and how their former master can give them property and even gain wealth in Scandinavia.

=== Gragas ===
The Grágás is the oldest known law code from Iceland which was formally written down in 1117 AD. The Gragas has various laws about freedmen and slaves. One such topic is the discussion of inheritance. A child born to a slave father and a free woman could not be a lawful heir. If a child is conceived while the mother is still a slave but born after she is freed, then the child is not a lawful heir. Even though the child is born free it is known as “scrubling” and must be given freedom a second time. If the child is conceived after the slave is freed, then there is no need to free the child again. If a woman gives a slave freedom, then the child is not a lawful heir either and this is known as “nookling.” And the penalty for this is full outlawry which is being stripped of all rights. Her husband is not under any penalty and the child born is called a “cribling." This suggests slaves and freed women had sexual relations with each other at an extent to be outlawed. Secondly, it shows a child born to a freed woman and a slave man had lesser rights than both freed parents which shows the law trying to keep these groups separate and shows an emphasis on social status and a barrier between the classes. Since inheritance was an important part in medieval Iceland, it was important to not be involved with a slave or the child will not get the inheritance. If a man sleeps with a slave- woman, his penalty is three marks and five neighbors of the man being charged are called to an assembly to witness or participate in the legal process. If a man sleeps with a freedman’s wife, then the penalty us lesser outlawry which is a temporary loss of rights. Unless the child was given freedom or if she had a free son then the penalty is full outlawry, and nine neighbors must be called locally to handle the prosecution. This is more evidence of a barrier between the classes because of the punishment. It shows how different people were valued based on class. It shows the difference between various classes such as freedmen and slaves if a crime occurs. It shows a form of jury and how the man is viewed by his peers if he will get off without penalty. The phrase "if she had a free son" shows the status of children could influence the various penalties, outcomes, and reputations that could be placed on the man.

== Freedom Process ==
To understand how a slave became “free” we must understand a couple of things. First, the word “free” has evolved over centuries. What this means is that the definition of this word was changing. What this means is that a free slave to our knowledge means he is not a slave anymore and can do whatever they want to but back then being a free slave meant you were still associated with your master. You may be able to have a house, have a family, contribute to the economy in your own way, and even have your own job as long as the master approved. A freedman had some obligation to their former master such as not having control over his own marriage, household, business dealings or being able to leave the farm without permission. Secondly, slavery was not about race. Just because you were an assorted color did not make you a slave. This then raises the question who were the slaves during the Viking era? Well, the slaves sold themselves to slavery to pay back their debts. Or more commonly when the Vikings would raid villages the people, they would capture would become enslaved. There is also a chance you could be born into slavery. Many historians mentioned that some masters were having intercourse with their slaves or were selling their slaves to people just for them to have intercourse with them.

=== Circumstances for Freedom ===
There are various circumstances where a slave could be sent free. Under Norwegian law, A slave could be freed by his father if he had a child with a slave. The slave child could be freed by other relatives if they took responsibility for the child. The master could not refuse unless it was his child. In some cases, it was okay to free a slave without the master’s consent. For example, if a master commits a serious crime, his slaves could be freed as punishment. In Swedish law, if someone falsely presented a slave as being free so he could marry a free woman, the slave would go free. In Uppland law, if a master attempted to sell his Christian slave, the slave would go free. In the law of Jutland, if a master tried to send his slave to do military service for him, the king could set him free. A master or the community could free a slave for good behavior or faithful service. Slaves can buy their own freedom though this is not common because it would be difficult for a slave to earn wealth. There are a few different laws for a slave to become free, but these laws do not tell us how many freed slaves there were during any time period. The skåne law says that the slave's family could free them if the slave masters say it is okay. There was some sort of bribery going on here. Next, The Swedish law says that if the slaves master were to do something horrible with the slave and get in trouble for what they did that slave would become free as a form of punishment towards the master. For example, if a slave master were to abuse a slave and get caught that slave would become free. Remember back then they did not really abuse slaves, they just used them for labor because they were helping the economy.

=== Manumission Process ===
The manumission process was given by the slave’s master and the slave would give a ceremony called a “freedom ale.” This would give the slave some freedom but not as much as someone who was born free. A slave would be given freedom by paying his master for freedom, but this is rare because a slave would not have the necessary wealth. A freedman and their descendants can be granted freedom but will never be at the same social status as someone who was unambiguously free. Eventually, the freedman’s ancestors will be granted freedom, but this could take many generations. This is the legal way a slave would become free, but it may have not worked this way all the time because this was a decentralized society. The people may have not followed the laws and it varied based on region.

=== Sagas ===
Laxdaela is a saga written in the 13th century which discusses the lives of various people in the Breiðafjörður region in the 9th to the 11th century. In multiple instances it discusses how slaves could be freed. Unn the deep minded was a powerful woman in the saga. She rewarded each one of her followers. Erp was the son of Earl Meldun. Erp was born of noble status but became a slave for unknown reasons. Unn explains she could not bear to see a man with such noble status be a slave and she frees Erp. This shows the privileges class had in this society. It shows someone who was of high class could be freed just based on who they were born to.

== Origins of the word Leysingi ==
A Leysingi is a Scandinavian term which was used to describe freedman around the twelfth century. Leysingi is a freed Thrall. It is stated in the book Kings and Vikings that the term was used as early as the ninth century in England. During this time, it would have been used to describe the freedman of the Danes.

It is debated on various words meanings especially among different regions in Scandinavia. Norwegian provincial law codes used many archaic words to describe various stages of freedom. Usually those from poetry. It is suspected that their meaning was not always understood. For example, the term frjálsgjafi, was used in Iceland for the slave owner who gave freedom, and that is the typical usage of the word. However in one set of Norwegian laws the word is used to describe the lowest grade of freed slave, who remained under some obligation to his former master. In Slavery in Medieval Scandinavia, Ruth Mazos Karras criticizes P.H Sawyer for this saying all four Norwegian law codes use the term to describe a shift in semantics between Iceland and Norway. This shows that words can change based on location. Karras also argues that a leysingi and frjálsgjafi are sometimes used in the law codes intechangably, but leysingi can also be used to describe a freedman with more rights and a frjálsgjafi describes a freedman with less rights because they have not taken their freedom ale.
