= Hörningsholm Hoard =

Swedish coin hoard

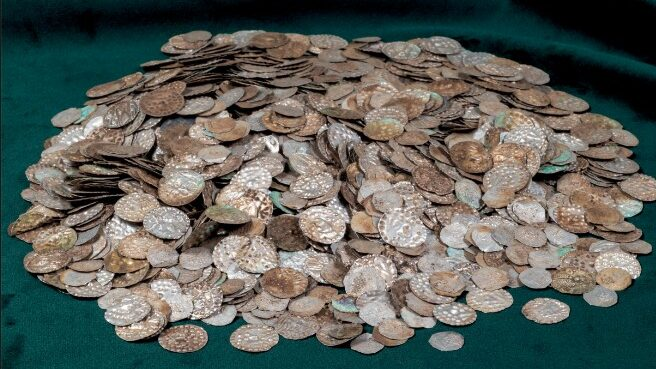
Part of the Hörningsholm Hoard

The Hörningsholm Hoard (Swedish: Hörningsholmsskatten) is a hoard of silver coins and other precious objects discovered on Mörkö island outside Södertälje in Sweden in 2025. The hoard is the largest coin hoard ever discovered in Sweden.

== Discovery ==
The hoard was discovered in August 2025 by a woman and her husband while they were digging for worms to use as fishing bait in the garden of their summer cottage on Mörkö island, just northeast of Hörningsholm Castle outside Södertälje in Sweden. The area contains several historical remains, including grave fields from the Iron Age.

The woman who made the discovery told the press that the hoard had been discovered just next to the spot where the couple had buried their dead cat some years earlier. She recalled that she initially did not understand what she had found, but that after making an image search online of one of the discovered coins, the search engine suggested that it could be a bracteate. Within hours, and in accordance with Swedish law, she had contacted the county administrative board of Stockholm to report her finding. Three days after the discovery an archaeologist was at the site.

The archaeologist, a representative from the county administrative board, and the house owner together dug up much of the hoard, which took three hours and filled more than two 10-litre (2.6 US gal) plastic buckets. Later, an excavator was brought in and a wider area examined. For security reasons, the location of the discovery was not immediately disclosed by the county administrative board, and the owner was not allowed to tell anybody about her discovery. The hoard was taken to an undisclosed location for analysis. The Swedish National Heritage Board concluded that it was the largest coin hoard ever discovered in Sweden. In 2026, the Swedish National Heritage Board announced that the woman who found the hoard would be rewarded with four million Swedish krona (US$420,000, €370,000, or £320,000 as of 2026), the highest reward ever paid out for an archaeological discovery of this kind in Sweden.

== Description ==
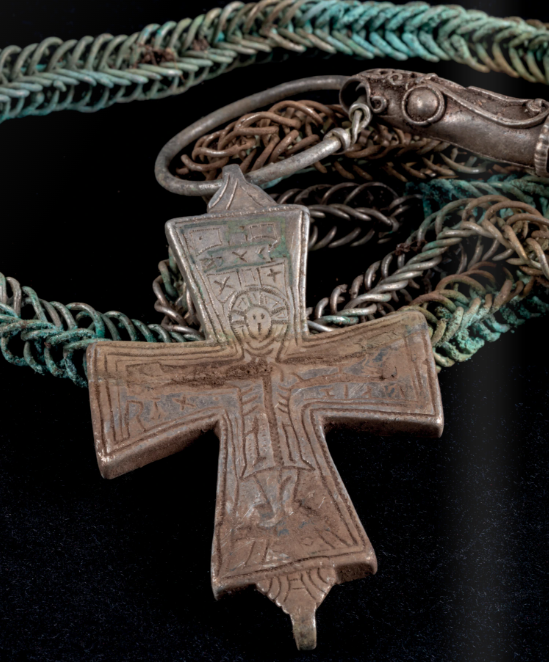
An early Christian engolpion from the Hörningsholm Hoard

The hoard weighs around 6 kilograms (13 lb). It consists of more than 24,000 silver coins and 114 other precious objects such as gold rings, pendants and silver beads. Most of the hoard was placed inside a copper cauldron. The coins date from the late 12th century while the items range in date from the late Viking Age to the early Swedish Middle Ages. The coins can be roughly divided into three types: coins minted on Gotland, in Svealand for King Knut Eriksson, and coins minted on behalf of an unknown bishop, also in Svealand. Most of the coins are intact but some have been clipped before being deposited. The other items include an engolpion, silver chains and other items deposited in two silver and copper bowls; similar sets of items have been found elsewhere in Sweden (including on Gotland and Gamla Uppsala) and are associated with early forms of liturgy and the Christianization of Scandinavia. Stylistically, some of the items deposited exhibit a mix of influences from Viking art and Romanesque art. In contrast to the coins, the items predominantly come from various areas outside the present-day borders of Sweden.

The county administrative board and the Swedish National Heritage Board have stated that the hoard is historically significant and may shed light on questions concerning the economy, society and international contacts of a period of Swedish history for which few written sources exist.

== See also ==
- Spillings Hoard
- Sundveda Hoard
