= Sundveda Hoard =

Viking Age hoard of 482 silver coins

Coordinates: 59.6196°N 17.8009°E

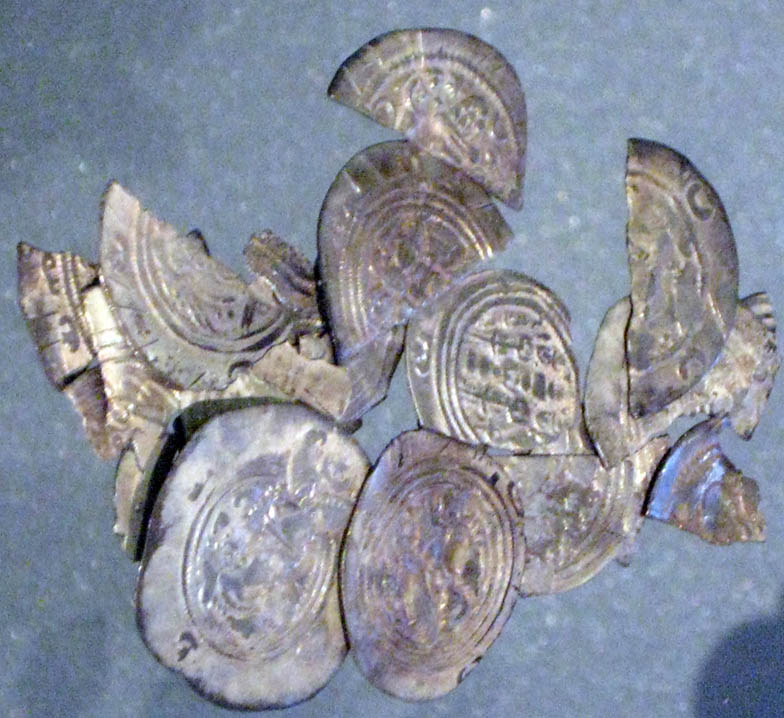
Silver coins from the Sundveda Hoard

The Sundveda Hoard (Swedish: Sundvedaskatten) is a Viking Age hoard of 482 silver coins found in 2008 in Sundveda between Märsta and Sigtuna, not far from Stockholm in Sweden. At the time of its discovery, it was the largest silver hoard found in the Mälaren region since 1827.

== Discovery ==
The Sundveda Hoard was discovered by archaeologists from the Swedish National Heritage Board while conducting an examination of a grave in Sundveda. The examination was ordered by the County administrative board of Stockholm as part of preparatory works ahead of the construction of a new residential area.

The finding of the hoard, which was described as a surprise, led to a more thorough examination of the grave. Apart from the silver hoard, bone fragments and other minor objects were discovered in the grave. Analyses showed that the bones were those of someone living at the middle of the 7th century, i.e., approximately 200 years before the hoard was placed there. Analysis of fragments of coal found in the grave, on the other hand, dated these to circa 100 AD. Archaeologists believe that the site may have had three distinct periods of usage: a first construction period during the first or second century but without burial; a burial approximately 500 years later; and finally the depositing of the silver hoard in the same site during the Viking Age. Several theories exist as to why the hoard was buried on the site. The silver coins may have been acquired as payment from trade in the present-day Baltic states or Russia. Alternatively, they may have been given as payment to a local resident for serving as a mercenary abroad.

At the time of its discovery, the hoard wa's the largest silver hoard to be discovered in the Mälaren region since 1827. The Hörningsholm Hoard, discovered in 2025, has since been concluded to be the largest coin hoard ever discovered in Sweden.

== The hoard ==
The hoard consists of 482 coins, of which all but one (a single Carolingian coin) are of eastern origin. 109 of the coins were intact when they were discovered while the rest were damaged or fragments of coins. Judging from the way the coins were found, it is possible that they were placed in the grave in a bag. The geographical range of the origins of the coins is vast, it includes North Africa, present-day Iran, Russia, the Arabian Peninsula and northern India. The oldest coins are Pre-Islamic. The most common category of coins represented are from the Abbasid Caliphate. Some of these coins were made in Baghdad and Damascus.

Judging from the age of the coins, the hoard could have been deposited at the site during the middle of the 9th century at the earliest. This would make it one of the earliest Viking Age hoards to be discovered on mainland Sweden.

The total weight of the hoard is approximately 660 grams (23 oz).

The hoard was displayed to the public at Sigtuna Museum in Sigtuna in 2008–2009.

== See also ==
- Hörningsholm Hoard
- Spillings Hoard
